= Biliprotein =

Class of pigment proteins in photosynthesising organisms

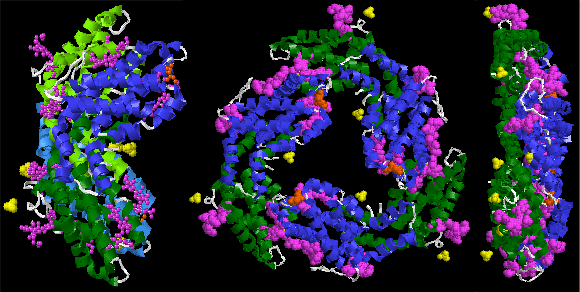
Crystal structure of B-phycoerythrin, a type of phycobiliprotein

Biliproteins are pigment protein compounds that are located in photosynthesising organisms such as algae, and sometimes also in certain insects. They refer to any protein that contains a bilin chromophore. In plants and algae, the main function of biliproteins is to make the process of light accumulation required for photosynthesis more efficient; while in insects they play a role in growth and development. Some of their properties: including light-receptivity, light-harvesting and fluorescence have made them suitable for applications in bioimaging and as indicators; while other properties such as anti-oxidation, anti-aging and anti-inflammation in phycobiliproteins have given them potential for use in medicine, cosmetics and food technology. While research on biliproteins dates back as far as 1950, it was hindered due to issues regarding biliprotein structure, lack of methods available for isolating individual biliprotein components, as well as limited information on lyase reactions (which are needed to join proteins with their chromophores). Research on biliproteins has also been primarily focused on phycobiliproteins; but advances in technology and methodology, along with the discovery of different types of lyases, has renewed interest in biliprotein research, allowing new opportunities for investigating biliprotein processes such as assembly/disassembly and protein folding.

== Functions ==
=== In plants and algae ===
Biliproteins found in plants and algae serve as a system of pigments whose purpose is to detect and absorb light needed for photosynthesis. The absorption spectra of biliproteins complements that of other photosynthetic pigments such as chlorophyll or carotene. The pigments detect and absorb energy from sunlight; the energy later being transferred to chlorophyll via internal energy transfer. According to a 2002 article written by Takashi Hirata et al., the chromophores of certain phycobiliproteins are responsible for antioxidant activities in these biliproteins, and phycocyanin also possesses anti-inflammatory qualities due to its inhibitory apoprotein. When induced by both collagen and adenosine triphosphate (ADP), the chromophore phycocyanobilin suppresses platelet aggregation in phycocyanin, its corresponding phycobiliprotein.

=== In insects ===
In insects, biliprotein lipocalins generally function to facilitate the changing of colours during camouflage, but other roles of biliproteins in insects have also been found. Functions such as preventing cellular damage, regulating guanylyl cyclase with biliverdin, among other roles associated with metabolic maintenance, have been hypothesised but yet to be proven. In the tobacco hornworm, the biliprotein insecticyanin (INS) was found to play a crucial part in embryonic development, as the absorption of INS into the moth eggs was observed.

== Structure ==
Chemical structure of a phycocyanobilin molecule (characterised by tetrapyrrole rings); the bilin chromophore of the phycocyanin biliprotein

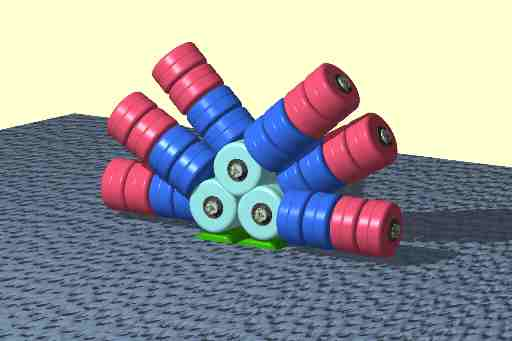
A phycobilisome made up by stacks of phycobiliprotein subunits attached together.

The structure of biliproteins is typically characterised by bilin chromophores arranged in a linear tetrapyrrolic formation, and the bilins are covalently bound to apoproteins via thioether bonds. Each type of biliprotein has a unique bilin that belongs to it (e.g. phycoerythrobilin is the chromophore of phycoerythrin and phycocyanobilin is the chromophore of phycocyanin). The bilin chromophores are formed by the oxidative cleavage of a haem ring and catalysed by haem oxygenases at one of four methine bridges, allowing four possible bilin isomers to occur. In all organisms known to have biliproteins, cleavage usually occurs at the α-bridge, generating biliverdin IXα.

Phycobiliproteins are grouped together in separate clusters, approximately 40nm in diameter, known as phycobilisomes. The structural changes involved in deriving bilins from their biliverdin IXα isomer determine the spectral range of light absorption.

The structure of biliproteins in insects differs slightly from those in plants and algae; they have a crystal structure and their chromophores are not covalently bound to the apoproteins. Unlike phycobiliproteins whose chromophores are held in an extended arrangement by specific interactions between chromophores and proteins, the chromophore in insect biliproteins has a cyclic helical crystal structure in the protein-bound state, as found in studies of the biliprotein extracted from the large white butterfly.

== Classes of biliproteins ==
=== Phycobiliproteins ===
Phycobiliproteins are found in cyanobacteria (also known as blue-green algae) and algae groups such as rhodophyta (red algae) and cryptophytes. Major phycobiliproteins include variations of phycocyanin (blue-pigment), variations of phycoerythrin (red pigment), and allophycocyanin (light-blue pigment); each of them possessing different spectral properties. These water-soluble biliproteins are not essential for the functioning of cells. Some special qualities of phycobiliproteins include antioxidant properties and high fluorescence, and it is their chromophores that give these proteins their strong pigment. Phycobiliproteins are classified into two categories based on their amino-terminal sequences: "α-type" and "β-type" sequences. In biliproteins where the number of bilins on the two subunits is unequal, the subunit with more bilins has a β-type amino sequence.

==== Phycochromes ====
Phycochromes are a subclass of phycobiliprotein that was initially recognised only as light sensory pigments in cyanobacteria. They are now deemed to constitute of all possible photoreversibly photochromic pigments, regardless of function. They are also found in red algae. In a series of journal articles written by G.S. and L.O. Björn, it was reported that phycochromes a, b, c and d were discovered by scientists who fractionated samples of blue-green algae using electrofocusing. The fractions with isoelectric points at or around 4.6 seemed analogous to phytochromes in that they possessed photochromic properties, yet were sensitive to light of shorter wavelengths. All four phycochromes except phycochrome c were extracted from the blue-green algae Tolypothrix distorta; whereas phycochrome a was also found in Phormidium luridum, Nostoc muscorum 1453/12 and Anacystis nidulans; and phycochrome c was extracted from Nostoc muscorum A and Tolypothrix tenuis.

=== Phytochromes ===
Phytochromes (also known as phys) were initially discovered in green plants in 1945. The photoreversible pigment was later found in fungi, mosses, and other algae groups due to the development of whole-genome sequencing, as explained in Peter H. Quail's 2010 journal article Phytochromes. As described in Hugo Scheer's 1981 journal article Biliproteins, phytochromes function as a sensor of light intensity in ‘high-energy’ reactions, i.e. in higher plants (e.g. underground seedlings), during transformation of heterotrophic blanching growth to autotrophic photosynthetic growth. They carry out this function by monitoring the various parameters of light signals (such as presence/absence, colour, intensity and photoperiodicity). This information is then transduced via intracellular signaling pathways that trigger responses specific to the organism and its development state on both cellular and molecular levels, as explained by Quail. Phytochromes are also responsible for regulating many aspects of a plant's growth, development and reproduction throughout its lifecycle.

=== Lipocalins (Insect biliproteins) ===
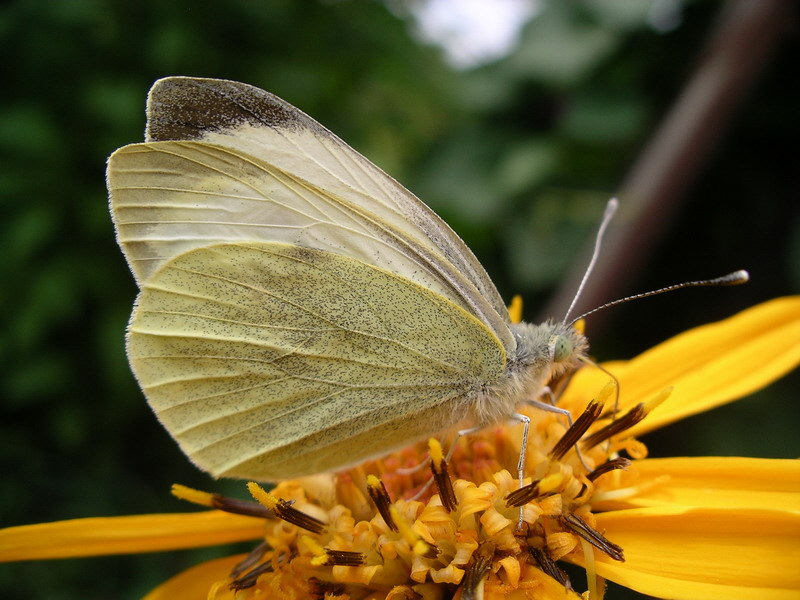
The large white butterfly (Pieris brassicae), from which the biliprotein known as 'bilin-binding protein' was extracted.

The lipocalins that have been identified as biliproteins have been found in a wide variety of insects, but mainly in the order Lepidoptera. Scientists have discovered them in the large white butterfly and a number of moth and silkmoth species, including the ailanthus and domestic silkmoths, giant silkworm moth, tobacco hawk moth, honeycomb moth, and the puss moth. The biliproteins associated with these insect species are the bilin-binding proteins, biliverdin-binding proteins, bombyrin, lipocalins 1 and 4, insecticyanin, gallerin and CV-bilin respectively. The biliproteins found in the tobacco hawk moth and pussmoth make up a major part of the insects’ haemolymph fluids.

The biliproteins that have been found in other insect orders apart from Lepidoptera still have unknown sequences, and so their lipocalin nature is still open.

== Comparison of biliproteins from different organisms ==
In a 1988 study conducted by Hugo Scheer and Harmut Kayser, biliproteins were extracted from the large white butterfly and puss moth and their respective properties were examined. Their properties were compared to those of plant and algae biliproteins, and their distinguishing features were taken into account.

Unlile plant and algae biliproteins whose bilins are generally only derived from the IXα biliverdin isomer, the bilins of insect biliproteins are also derived from the IXγ isomer, which is almost exclusively found in Lepidoptera. The study cited from M. Bois-Choussy and M. Barbier that these IXγ-series bile pigments are derived from cleavage of the porphyrin precursors at the C-15 (formerly γ) methine bridge, which is uncharacteristic of other mammalian and plant biliproteins. When the scientists examined biliproteins from both the large white butterfly and puss moth, they found that their polypeptides had a low α-helix content in comparison to phycobiliproteins.

It was hypothesised that the role of biliproteins in insects would also have a role related to light-absorption similar to that in plant and algae biliproteins. However, when the photochemical properties required for light-absorption were found absent in the biliprotein of the large white butterfly, this hypothesis was eliminated, followed by the assumption that those photochemical properties also do not occur in any other insect biliproteins.

Based on these examinations, it was concluded that insect biliproteins are only loosely related to those from plants and algae, due to the large number of differences they have regarding structure, chemical composition, derivation of bilins and general functions.

== Applications ==
=== Bioimaging ===
Fluorescent proteins have had a substantial impact on bioimaging, which is why biliproteins have made suitable candidates for the application, due to their properties of fluorescence, light-harvesting, light-sensitivity and photoswitching (the latter occurring only in phytochromes). Phycobiliproteins, which are highly fluorescent, have been used in external applications of bioimaging since the early 1980s. That application requires the bilin chromophore to be synthesised from haem, after which a lyase is needed to covalently bond the bilin to its corresponding apoprotein. An alternative method of uses phytochromes instead; some phytochromes only require one enzyme, haem oxygenase, for synthesising chromophores. Another benefit of using phytochromes is that they bind to their bilins autocatalytically. While there are photochromic pigments with poor fluorescence, this problem has been alleviated by engineering protein variants that reduce photochemistry and enhance fluorescence.

=== Food, medicine and cosmetics ===
Properties of phycobiliproteins, such as their natural antioxidant, anti-inflammatory, food colourant, strong pigment and anti-aging activities, have given them considerable potential for use in food, cosmetics and medicinal applications. They have also proven to be therapeutic in treating diseases such as Alzheimer's disease and cancer. Given their large range of applications and potential uses, researchers have been trying to find and develop ways to produce and purify phycobiliproteins to meet the growing demand for them. One such phycobiliprotein is C-phycocyanin (C-PC), which is found in spirulina. A limiting factor of C-PC's usage in these applications is its protein stability, given that in its natural form, C-PC is highly sensitive to light and heat when in aqueous solution, due to its photosensitive phycocyanobilin (PCB) chromophore, which also makes it prone to free-radical oxidation. Like other natural food colourants, C-PC is also sensitive to acidic conditions and oxidant exposure. This has prompted studies to develop methods of stabilising C-PC/PCB and expand their applications to other food systems.

More details on the applications of phycocyanin in food and medicine can be found here.

=== Indicator of drinking water quality ===
The fluorescence signals emitted from phycoerythrin and phycocyanin have made them suitable for use as indicators to detect cyanotoxins such as microcystins in drinking water. A study examined the nature of the biliproteins' fluorescence signals regarding their real-time character, sensitivity and the biliproteins' behaviour in different treatment stages (of water) in comparison to microcystins. The fluorescence signals' real-time character was confirmed by fluorescence measurements, as they can be carried out without having to pre-concentrate the biliproteins. If the ratio of biliprotein to microcystin is above 1, the fluorescence signals can estimate very low concentrations of microcystins. A test conducted in 2009 compared the behaviour of both biliproteins and selected microcystins MC-LR and MC-RR during water treatment. The test results showed that the biliproteins have an early warning function against microcystins in conventional treatment stages that use pre-oxidation with permanganate, activated carbon and chlorination. However, the early warning function does not occur when chlorine dioxide is used as a pre-oxidant or final disinfectant. It is important for the biliprotein/toxin ratio of raw water to be known in order to use the biliproteins for control measurements in drinking water treatment.

== See also ==
- Chromoproteins
- Photoreceptor protein
