= Bilin (biochemistry) =

Class of chemical compound

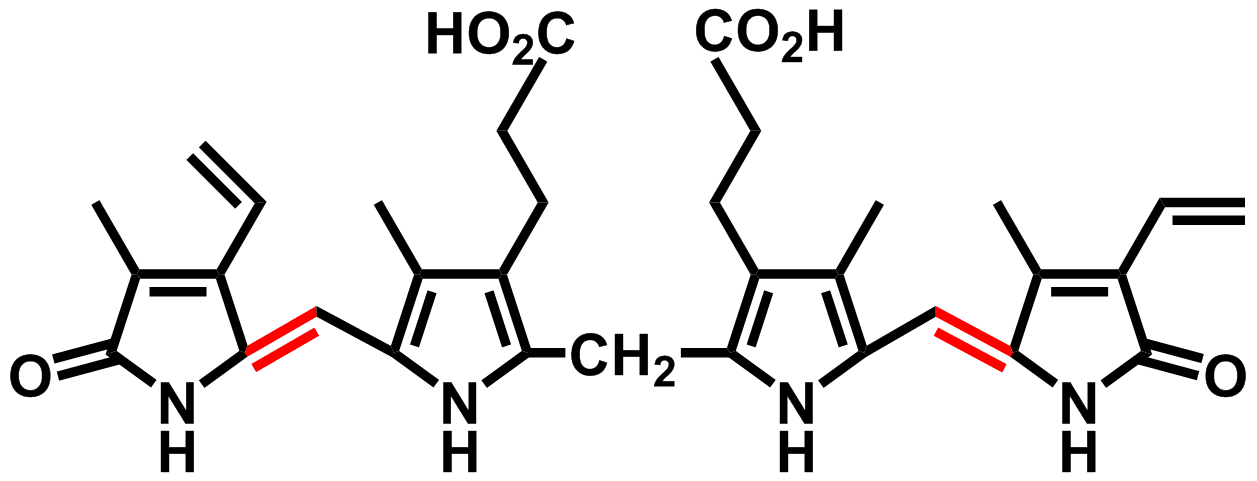
Bilirubin, a yellow bilin, is a breakdown product of heme

Bilins, bilanes or bile pigments are biological pigments formed in many organisms as a metabolic product of certain porphyrins. Bilin (also called bilichrome) was named as a bile pigment of mammals, but can also be found in lower vertebrates, invertebrates, as well as red algae, green plants and cyanobacteria. Bilins can range in color from red, orange, yellow or brown to blue or green.

In chemical terms, bilins are linear arrangements of four pyrrole rings (tetrapyrroles). In human metabolism, bilirubin is a breakdown product of heme. A modified bilane is an intermediate in the biosynthesis and uroporphyrinogen III from porphobilinogen.

Examples of bilins are found in animals (cardinal examples are bilirubin and biliverdin), and phycocyanobilin, the chromophore of the photosynthetic pigment phycocyanin, in algae and plants. In plants, bilins also serve as the photopigments of the photoreceptor protein phytochrome. An example of an invertebrate bilin is micromatabilin, which is responsible for the green color of the Green Huntsman Spider, Micrommata virescens.

== In plants ==
Most photosynthetic, oxygen-producing organisms contain the positive chlorophyll biosynthesis regulator GENOMES UNCOUPLED 4 (GUN4). Research suggests that GUN4 regulates chlorophyll synthesis, by activating the enzyme Magnesium chelatase, which catalyzes the insertion of Mg^{2+} into Protoporphyrin IX. Bilins noncovalently bind to CrGUN4, an algal GUN4 from Chlamydomonas reinhardtii, which has been shown to participate in retrograde signaling.

== Bilin-binding protein in butterfly wings ==
Butterfly wings are a new site of porphyrin synthesis and cleavage where bilin is portrayed; the expression of the lipocalin bilin-binding protein in Pieris brassicae. The function of the biliprotein during wing development is still unknown, as is the existence of an active pathway for porphyrin synthesis and cleavage in insect wings, which has been demonstrated here for the first time. The bilin-binding protein from Pieris brassicae, which was discovered to have a crystal structure, was one of the initial members of the lipocalins protein superfamily, which has since grown significantly. It is a blue pigment protein that can be clearly identified by its amino acid sequence and crystal structure. The bilin-binding protein is predominantly present in hemolymph, fat body, and epidermis in the last instar larval and in the wings of the adult insect of Pieris brassicae. Although it has recently been discovered that three swallowtail butterfly larval color patterns are correlated with the combination of bilin-binding protein and the yellow-related gene, additional physiological activities are still unknown. Normally, insect bilins are joined to proteins to create a variety of biliproteins that have been identified in Lepidoptera and other insects. The presence of the blue and yellow pigments contributes to the blue-green hue of some lepidopteran larvae. Blue pigments and yellow carotenoids are thought to work together as camouflage.

Bilin-binding protein is a member of the lipocalin family, which includes extracellular proteins with a number of molecular ligand features in common, including the ability to bind tiny, primarily lipophilic compounds like retinol. Members of the lipocalin family have mostly been classified as transport proteins, but it is clear that they also perform a range of other tasks, including retinol transport, invertebrate cryptic coloring, olfaction, and pheromone transmission. There is a lot of structural and functional variation in the lipocalin family, both within and between species.

== See also ==
- Bilirubin
- Biliverdin
- Biliprotein
- Phycobilin
- Phycobiliprotein
- Phycoerythrobilin
- Stercobilin
- Urobilin
- Gmelin's test
