= Alexander Glazer =

Polish-American biologist (1935–2021)

Alexander Namiot Glazer (7 July 1935 – 18 July 2021) was a Polish-born American professor of the Graduate School in the Department of Molecular and Cell Biology at the University of California, Berkeley. He had a passion for protein chemistry and structure function relationships. He also had a longstanding interest in light-harvesting complexes in cyanobacteria and red algae called phycobilisomes. He had also spent more than 10 years working on the human genome project where he has investigated methods for DNA detection and sequencing which most notably includes the development of fluorescent reagents involved in cell labeling. Most recently, he had focused his studies on issues in environmental sciences. He died on July 18, 2021, in Orinda, California, at the age of 86.

== Early life ==
Glazer was born in Lodz, Poland in 1935 and then moved to Australia where he earned his bachelor's and master's degrees from the University of Sydney in 1957 and 1958, respectively. His master's thesis at the University of Sydney was based on the physiochemical studies of proteins. At the University of Sydney, Glazer saw a lecture by Emil Smith on the proteolytic enzyme papain. This lecture was so inspiring for Glazer that after it, he went to the University of Utah to continue studying with Smith. He earned his Ph.D. from the University of Utah in 1960.

== Early career ==
After graduating from the University of Utah, Glazer relocated to Israel, where he completed a postdoctoral fellowship in the Department of Biophysics at the Weizmann Institute of Science. He resumed his postdoctoral work at the MRC Laboratory of Molecular Biology in Cambridge, where he researched the labeling of proteins with radioactive isotope in order to determine amino acid sequences. In 1964, he became part of the faculty of the Department of Biological Chemistry at the University of California Los Angeles School of Medicine. Glazer is now a professor of the Graduate School Division of Biochemistry, Biophysics and Structural Biology.

== Research on cyanobacteria and red algae ==
The light reactions in photosynthesis start with an antenna complex absorbing a photon. This excitation energy is transferred from one chromophore to another and ends at a pair of chlorophyll molecules in a transmembrane reaction center complex. Each transmembrane reaction center complex is associated with an antenna complex that has hundreds of light-harvesting pigment molecules. In fact, a common feature of all photosynthetic machinery in bacteria, algae and plants is the existence of many antenna complexes that can absorb the light and transfer it to a transmembrane reaction center complex. The light-harvesting pigment molecules are made of proteins that are covalently attached to open chain tetrapyrrole prosthetic groups called bilins that can absorb light. These antenna assemblies within cyanobacteria and red algae are called phycobilisomes. These phycobilisomes are of particular interest to scientists because they are the biggest light-harvesting complexes that can be isolated and studied without disruption to the cell. They are able to be isolated from the cell easily because they are located on the peripheral membrane and can be easily separated from the photosynthetic lamellae by mild detergent.

In one study, Glazer and his colleague Suen Fang analyzed the chromophore content of a blue-green algae called phycocyanin and allophycocyanin that was derived from Synechococcus sp., which is a unicellular cyanobacterium. They found that the phycocyanin carried three phycocyanobilin chromophores, two of which were bound to a beta subunit and one of which was bound to an alpha subunit. Furthermore, in experiments with blue-green algae other than those derived from Synechococcus sp. it was concluded that this discovered chromophore distribution is maintained among most cyanophytan phycobiliproteins. This study determined the distribution of the chromophores in the blue-green algae phycocyanin.

Glazer also investigated the structural and molecular organization of the photosynthetic accessory pigments in Cyanobacteria, which are the blue-green algae, and in Rhodophyta, which are the red algae. Both of these algae have high levels of photosynthetic accessory pigments, called phycobiliproteins, which collect light energy around 525 nm. The phycobiliproteins are easy to study because they are soluble in aqueous solution, can be easily isolated and crystallize readily. Thus, this allows them to be examined easily through X-ray diffraction and electron microscopy. In vivo, these phycobiliproteins were able to be organized onto the surface of photosynthetic lamellae to investigate the specific pathway of energy transfer. The following pathway was discovered: Phycoerythrin → Phycocyanin → (λ_{max} ~ 560 nm) (λ_{max} ~ 620 nm) Allophycocyanin → Allophycocyanin B → (λ_{max} 650 nm)(λ_{max} 671 nm) Chlorophyll a (λ_{max} 680 nm). Overall, his work showed that the phycobilisomes have a specific directional pathway for energy transfer towards the reaction center regardless of where this light harvesting complex is located.

Glazer also examined the process of making a fluorescent holophycobiliprotein subunit from a cyanobacterium in Escherichia coli. This was significant because it showed that it was possible to produce these proteins in situ where they could be used as fluorescent protein probes in living cells. Glazer also examined the physical and spectroscopic properties of phycobiliproteins. Due to their brightly colored nature, he noted how they could be used in flow cytometry and in the detection of reactive oxygen species.

== Research on environmental science ==
Most recently, Glazer has shifted his attention to focus on diverse issues in environmental science, such as the impact of anthropogenic fixed nitrogen, the lack of and contamination of freshwater sources, and the impacts of natural gas and oil production.

Anthropogenic fixed nitrogen has originated from human activity. Glazer discussed in a published paper from 2010 that throughout the past century, new agriculture practices to meet the growing food demand have negatively impacted the nitrogen cycle. This has caused excessive richness in nutrients due to runoff but also an increase in animal death due to a lack of oxygen. He also noted that there has been a drastic increase in the greenhouse gas, nitrous oxide. Glazer notes that the damage caused by human activities to the nitrogen cycle could last for decades if large scale interventions are not implemented soon.

Glazer also investigated the depletion and contamination of freshwater resources in detail. Overly dry land and semi dry land are home to over 38% of the world's population and has become a limiting resource here. Withdrawal of groundwater, which is freshwater in the soil that is stored in pores between rocks and soil particles, has severely impacted the groundwater dependent ecosystems. Glazer has focused on the challenges involved with replacing groundwater and analyzes if the costs of these groundwater withdrawals are being recognized.

Glazer has also analyzed the importance of natural reserves. These areas help protect wilderness and biodiversity, are important for scientific research, maintain traditions and can be used for educational purposes. Over 12.5% of earth's surface is covered in natural reserves but there are currently many threats to them that are leading to an uncertain future.

Furthermore, Glazer analyzed the conserved amino acid sequence features in MoFe, VFe, and FeFe alpha subunits to determine if there is an evolutionary trend flowing from one type of nitrogenase to another. Finally, Glazer explored the occurrence of lateral gene transfer by using nitrogen fixation genes. This investigation sought to determine the occurrence of lateral gene transfer in the context of prokaryotic nitrogen fixation.

== Memberships ==
- 1998-2009: Director of the University of California Natural Reserve System
- 1997-2005: University of California System representative on the California Biodiversity Council

== Awards and honors ==
- 1955: British Association for the Advancement of Science's Endeavour Prize
- 1970-1971: Guggenheim fellowship
- 1980: Botanical Society of America's Darbaker Prize
- 1982-1983: Guggenheim fellowship
- 1991: National Academy of Sciences Award for Excellence in Scientific Reviewing
