= Biological pigment =

Substances produced by living organisms

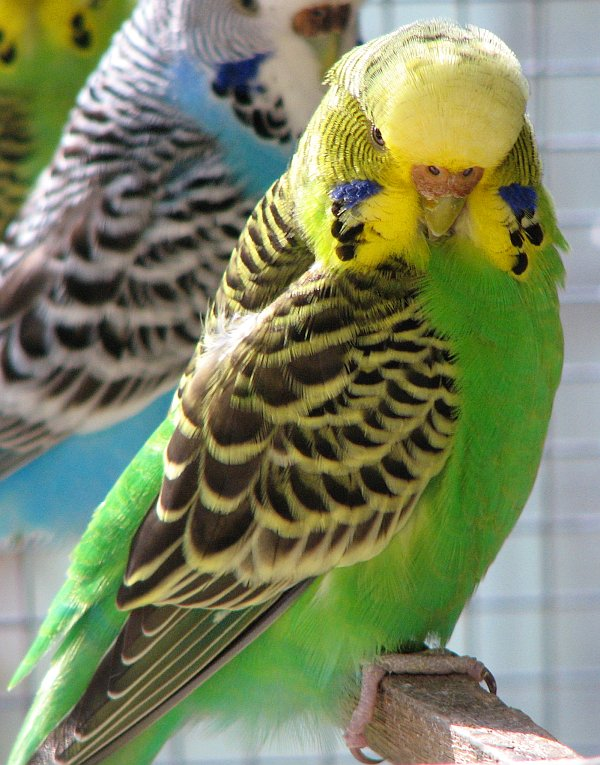
The budgerigar gets its yellow color from a psittacofulvin pigment and its green color from a combination of the same yellow pigment and blue structural color. The blue and white bird in the background lacks the yellow pigment. The dark markings on both birds are due to the black pigment eumelanin.

A biological pigment, also known simply as a pigment or biochrome, is a substance produced by living organisms that have a color resulting from selective color absorption. Biological pigments include plant pigments and flower pigments. Many biological structures, such as skin, eyes, feathers, fur and hair contain pigments such as melanin in specialized cells called chromatophores. In some species, pigments accrue over very long periods during an individual's lifespan.

Pigment color differs from structural color in that it is the same for all viewing angles, whereas structural color is the result of selective reflection or iridescence, usually because of multilayer structures. For example, butterfly wings typically contain structural color, although many butterflies have cells that contain pigment as well.

== Biological pigments ==
See conjugated systems for electron bond chemistry that causes these molecules to have pigment.

- Heme/porphyrin-based: chlorophyll, bilirubin, hemocyanin, hemoglobin, myoglobin
- Light-emitting: luciferin
- Carotenoids:
  - Hematochromes (algal pigments, mixes of carotenoids and their derivates)
  - Carotenes: alpha and beta carotene, lycopene, rhodopsin
  - Xanthophylls: canthaxanthin, zeaxanthin, lutein
- Proteinaceous: phytochrome, phycobiliproteins
- Psittacofulvins: a class of red and yellow pigments unique to parrots
- Turacin and Turacoverdin: red and green pigments found in turacos and related species
- Anthoxanthins: white color of some plants
- Other: melanin, urochrome, flavonoids

== Pigments in plants ==
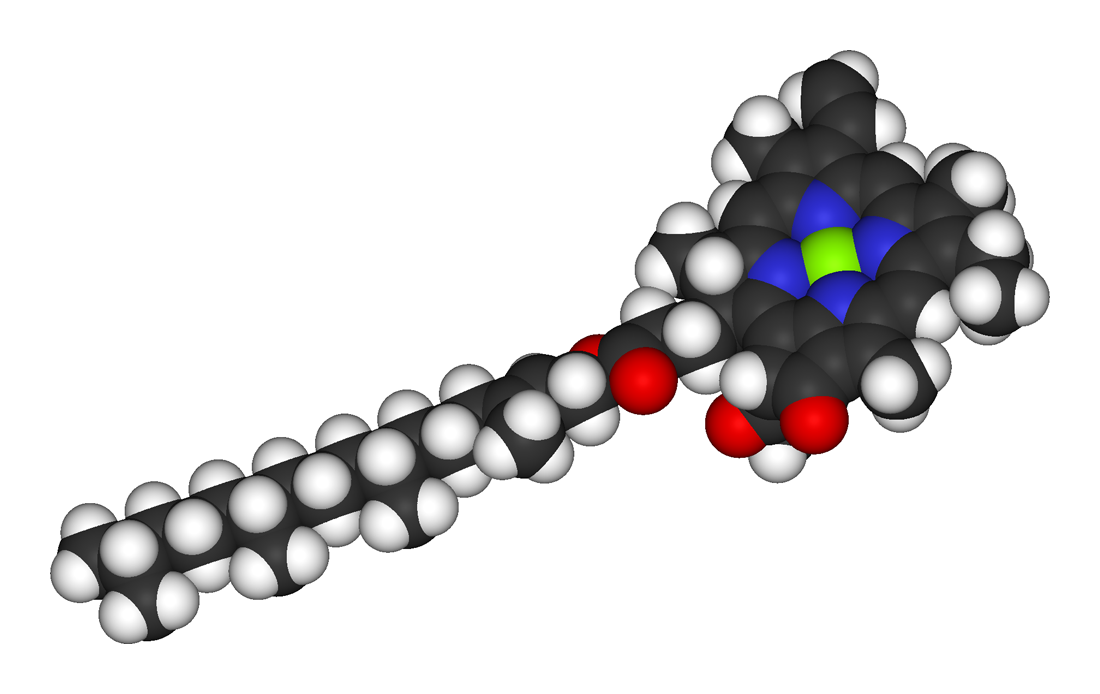
Space-filling model of the chlorophyll molecule

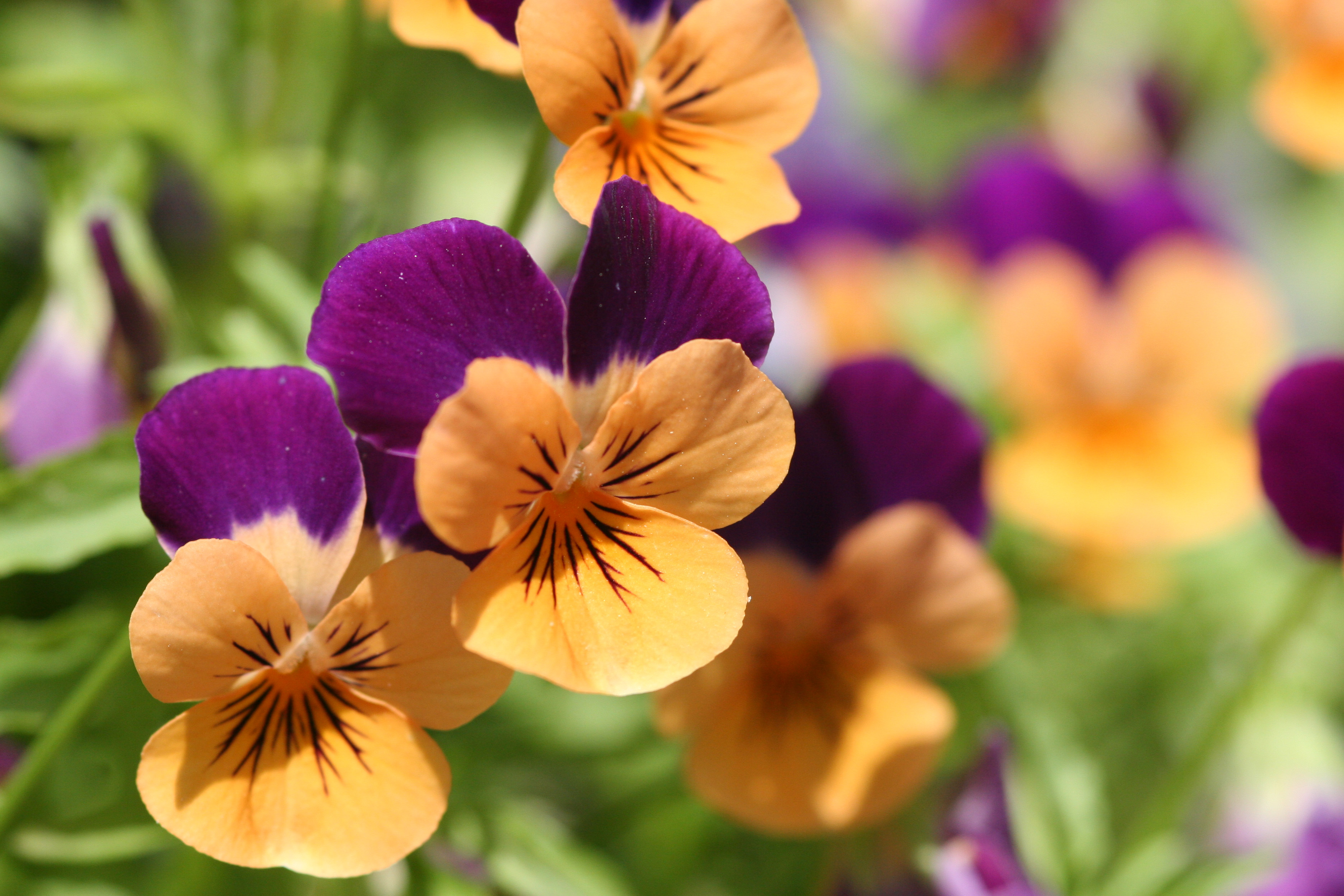
Anthocyanin gives these pansies their purple pigmentation.

The primary function of pigments in plants is photosynthesis, which uses the green pigment chlorophyll and several colorful pigments that absorb as much light energy as possible. Pigments are also known to play a role in pollination where pigment accumulation or loss can lead to floral color change, signaling to pollinators which flowers are rewarding and contain more pollen and nectar.

Plant pigments include many molecules, such as porphyrins, carotenoids, anthocyanins and betalains. All biological pigments selectively absorb certain wavelengths of light while reflecting others.

The principal pigments responsible are:

- Chlorophyll is the primary pigment in plants; it is a chlorin that absorbs blue and red wavelengths of light while reflecting a majority of green. It is the presence and relative abundance of chlorophyll that gives plants their green color. All land plants and green algae possess two forms of this pigment: chlorophyll a and chlorophyll b. Kelps, diatoms, and other photosynthetic heterokonts contain chlorophyll c instead of b, while red algae possess only chlorophyll a. All chlorophylls serve as the primary means plants use to intercept light in order to fuel photosynthesis.
- Carotenoids are red, orange, or yellow tetraterpenoids. During the process of photosynthesis, they have functions in light-harvesting (as accessory pigments), in photoprotection (energy dissipation via non-photochemical quenching as well as singlet oxygen scavenging for prevention of photooxidative damage), and also serve as protein structural elements. In higher plants, they also serve as precursors to the plant hormone abscisic acid.
- Betalains are red or yellow pigments. Like anthocyanins they are water-soluble, but unlike anthocyanins they are synthesized from tyrosine. This class of pigments is found only in the Caryophyllales (including cactus and amaranth), and never co-occur in plants with anthocyanins. Betalains are responsible for the deep red color of beets.
- Anthocyanins (literally "flower blue") are water-soluble flavonoid pigments that appear red to blue, according to pH. They occur in all tissues of higher plants, providing color in leaves, plant stem, roots, flowers, and fruits, though not always in sufficient quantities to be noticeable. Anthocyanins are most visible in the petals of flowers of many species.

Plants, in general, contain six ubiquitous carotenoids: neoxanthin, violaxanthin, antheraxanthin, zeaxanthin, lutein and β-carotene. Lutein is a yellow pigment found in fruits and vegetables and is the most abundant carotenoid in plants. Lycopene is the red pigment responsible for the color of tomatoes. Other less common carotenoids in plants include lutein epoxide (in many woody species), lactucaxanthin (found in lettuce), and alpha carotene (found in carrots).

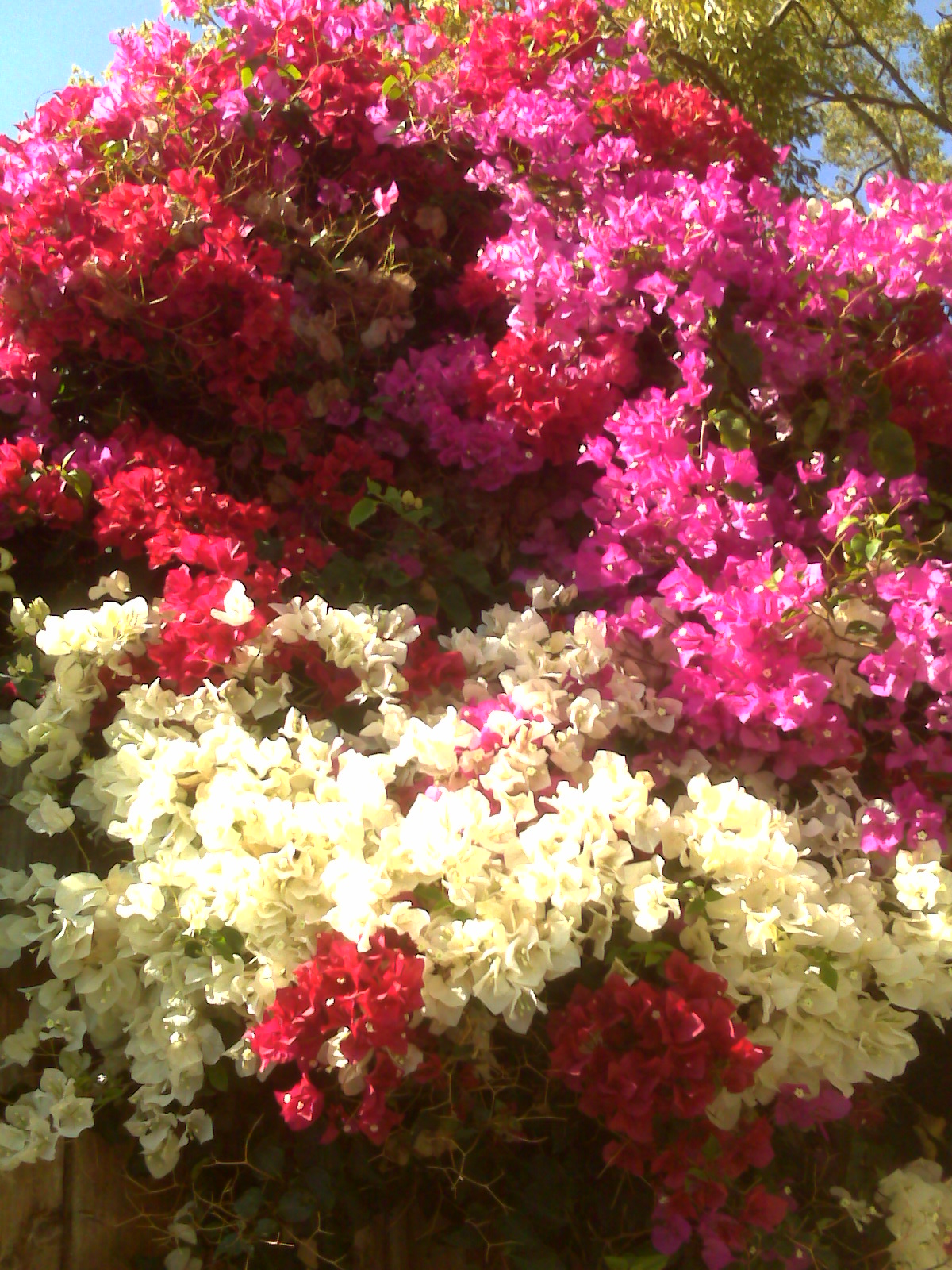
Bougainvillea bracts get their color from betalains.

A particularly noticeable manifestation of pigmentation in plants is seen with autumn leaf color, a phenomenon that affects the normally green leaves of many deciduous trees and shrubs whereby they take on, during a few weeks in the autumn season, various shades of red, yellow, purple, and brown. Chlorophylls degrade into colorless tetrapyrroles known as nonfluorescent chlorophyll catabolites (NCCs). As the predominant chlorophylls degrade, the hidden pigments of yellow xanthophylls and orange beta-carotene are revealed. These pigments are present throughout the year, but the red pigments, the anthocyanins, are synthesized de novo once roughly half of chlorophyll has been degraded. The amino acids released from degradation of light harvesting complexes are stored all winter in the tree's roots, branches, stems, and trunk until next spring when they are recycled to re‑leaf the tree.

== Pigments in algae ==
Algae are very diverse photosynthetic organisms, which differ from plants in that they are aquatic organisms, they do not present vascular tissue and do not generate an embryo. However, both types of organisms share the possession of photosynthetic pigments, which absorb and release energy that is later used by the cell. These pigments in addition to chlorophylls, are phycobiliproteins, fucoxanthins, xanthophylls and carotenes, which serve to trap the energy of light and lead it to the primary pigment, which is responsible for initiating oxygenic photosynthesis reactions.

Algal phototrophs such as dinoflagellates use peridinin as a light harvesting pigment. While carotenoids can be found complexed within chlorophyll-binding proteins such as the photosynthetic reaction centers and light-harvesting complexes, they also are found within dedicated carotenoid proteins such as the orange carotenoid protein of cyanobacteria.

Table 1. Pigments in algae
Group	Pigment
Green algae	Chlorophyll a and b
Red algae	Chlorophyll a; Phycobiliproteins; Phycoerythrin red-purple pigment, it is the dominant one in the species that have a red-purple color.
Golden and Brown algae	Chlorophyll a and c; Xanthophyll; Fucoxanthin

== Pigments in bacteria ==
Bacteria produce pigments such as carotenoids, melanin, violacein, prodigiosin, pyocyanin, actinorhodin, and zeaxanthin. Cyanobacteria produce phycocyanin, phycoerythrin, scytonemin, chlorophyll a, chlorophyll d, and chlorophyll f. Purple sulfur bacteria produce bacteriochlorophyll a and bacteriochlorophyll b. In cyanobacteria, many other carotenoids exist such as canthaxanthin, myxoxanthophyll, synechoxanthin, and echinenone.

Table 2. Pigments in bacteria
Group	Pigment
Cyanobacteria	Chlorophyll a, Chlorophyll d and Chlorophyll f; Phycocyanin blue-green pigment, is the dominant pigment in cyanobacteria; Allophycocyanin; Phycoerithrin; Scytonemin; Cyanophycin; Carotenoids
Purple bacteria	Bacteriochlorophyll a and b
Green bacteria	Bacteriochlorophyll c and e
Chromobacterium	Violacein
Streptomyces	Melanin
Micromonospora	Anthraquinone

== Pigments in animals ==
Pigmentation is used by many animals for protection, by means of camouflage, mimicry, or warning coloration. Some animals including fish, amphibians and cephalopods use pigmented chromatophores to provide camouflage that varies to match the background.

Pigmentation is used in signalling between animals, such as in courtship and reproductive behavior. For example, some cephalopods use their chromatophores to communicate.

The photopigment rhodopsin intercepts light as the first step in the perception of light.

Skin pigments such as melanin may protect tissues from sunburn by ultraviolet radiation.

However, some biological pigments in animals, such as heme groups that help to carry oxygen in the blood, are colored as a result of happenstance. Their color does not have a protective or signalling function.

Pea aphids (Acyrthosiphon pisum), two-spotted spider mites (Tetranychus urticae), and gall midges (family Cecidomyiidae) are the only known animals capable of synthesizing carotenoids. The presence of genes for synthesizing carotenoids in these arthropods has been attributed to independent horizontal gene transfer (HGT) events from fungi.

=== Diseases and conditions ===
A variety of diseases and abnormal conditions that involve pigmentation are in humans and animals, either from absence of or loss of pigmentation or pigment cells, or from the excess production of pigment.

- Albinism is an inherited disorder characterized by total or partial loss of melanin. Humans and animals that suffer from albinism are called "albinistic" (the term "albino" is also sometimes used, but may be considered offensive when applied to people).
- Lamellar ichthyosis, also called "fish scale disease", is an inherited condition in which one symptom is excess production of melanin. The skin is darker than normal, and is characterized by darkened, scaly, dry patches.
- Melasma is a condition in which dark brown patches of pigment appear on the face, influenced by hormonal changes. When it occurs during a pregnancy, this condition is called the mask of pregnancy.
- ocular pigmentation is an accumulation of pigment in the eye, and may be caused by latanoprost medication.
- Vitiligo is a condition in which there is a loss of pigment-producing cells called melanocytes in patches of skin.

=== Pigments in marine animals ===
==== Carotenoids and carotenoproteins ====
Carotenoids are the most common group of pigments found in nature. Over 600 different kinds of carotenoids are found in animals, plants, and microorganisms.

Marine animals are incapable of making their own carotenoids and thus rely on plants for these pigments. Carotenoproteins are especially common among marine animals. These complexes are responsible for the various colors (red, purple, blue, green, etc.) to these marine invertebrates for mating rituals and camouflage. There are two main types of carotenoproteins: Type A and Type B. Type A has carotenoids (chromogen) which are stoichiometrically associated with a simple protein (glycoprotein). The second type, Type B, has carotenoids which are associated with a lipo protein and is usually less stable. While Type A is commonly found in the surface (shells and skins) of marine invertebrates, Type B is usually in eggs, ovaries, and blood. The colors and characteristic absorption of these carotenoprotein complexes are based upon the chemical binding of the chromogen and the protein subunits.

For example, the blue carotenoprotein, linckiacyanin has about 100–200 carotenoid molecules per every complex. In addition, the functions of these pigment-protein complexes also change their chemical structure as well. Carotenoproteins that are within the photosynthetic structure are more common, but complicated. Pigment-protein complexes that are outside of the photosynthetic system are less common, but have a simpler structure. For example, there are only two of these blue astaxanthin-proteins in the jellyfish, Velella velella, contains only about 100 carotenoids per complex.

A common carotenoid in animals is astaxanthin, which gives off a purple-blue and green pigment. Astaxanthin's color is formed by creating complexes with proteins in a certain order. For example, the crustochrin has approximately 20 astaxanthin molecules bonded with protein. When the complexes interact by exciton-exciton interaction, it lowers the absorbance maximum, changing the different color pigments.

In lobsters, there are various types of astaxanthin-protein complexes present. The first one is crustacyanin (max 632 nm), a slate-blue pigment found in the lobster's carapace. The second one is crustochrin (max 409), a yellow pigment which is found on the outer layer of the carapace. Lastly, the lipoglycoprotein and ovoverdin forms a bright green pigment that is usually present in the outer layers of the carapace and the lobster eggs.

==== Tetrapyrroles ====
Tetrapyrroles are the next most common group of pigments. They have four pyrrole rings, each ring consisting of C_{4}H_{4}NH. The main role of the tetrapyrroles is their connection in the biological oxidation process. Tetrapyrroles have a major role in electron transport and act as a replacement for many enzymes. They also have a role in the pigmentation of the marine organism's tissues.

==== Melanin ====
Melanin is a class of compounds that serves as a pigment with different structures responsible for dark, tan, yellowish / reddish pigments in marine animals. It is produced as the amino acid tyrosine is converted into melanin, which is found in the skin, hair, and eyes. Derived from aerobic oxidation of phenols, they are polymers.

There are several different types of melanins considering that they are an aggregate of smaller component molecules, such as nitrogen containing melanins. There are two classes of pigments: black and brown insoluble eumelanins, which are derived from aerobic oxidation of tyrosine in the presence of tyrosinase, and the alkali-soluble phaeomelanins which range from a yellow to red brown color, arising from the deviation of the eumelanin pathway through the intervention of cysteine and/or glutathione. Eumelanins are usually found in the skin and eyes. Several different melanins include melanoprotein (dark brown melanin that is stored in high concentrations in the ink sac of the cuttlefish Sepia Officianalis), echinoidea (found in sand dollars, and the hearts of sea urchins), holothuroidea (found in sea cucumbers), and ophiuroidea (found in brittle and snake stars). These melanins are possibly polymers which arise from the repeated coupling of simple bi-polyfunctional monomeric intermediates, or of high molecular weights. The compounds benzothiazole and tetrahydroisoquinoline ring systems act as UV-absorbing compounds.

==== Bioluminescence ====
The only light source in the deep sea, marine animals give off visible light energy called bioluminescence, a subset of chemiluminescence. This is the chemical reaction in which chemical energy is converted to light energy. It is estimated that 90% of deep-sea animals produce some sort of bioluminescence. Considering that a large proportion of the visible light spectrum is absorbed before reaching the deep sea, most of the emitted light from the sea-animals is blue and green. However, some species may emit a red and infrared light, and there has even been a genus that is found to emit yellow bioluminescence. The organ that is responsible for the emission of bioluminescence is known as photophores. This type is only present in squid and fish, and is used to illuminate their ventral surfaces, which disguise their silhouettes from predators. The uses of the photophores in the sea-animals differ, such as lenses for controlling intensity of color, and the intensity of the light produced. Squids have both photophores and chromatophores which controls both of these intensities. Another thing that is responsible for the emission of bioluminescence, which is evident in the bursts of light that jellyfish emit, start with a luciferin (a photogen) and ends with the light emitter (a photagogikon.) Luciferin, luciferase, salt, and oxygen react and combine to create a single unit called photo-proteins, which can produce light when reacted with another molecule such as Ca+. Jellyfish use this as a defense mechanism; when a smaller predator is attempting to devour a jellyfish, it will flash its lights, which would therefore lure a larger predator and chase the smaller predator away. It is also used as mating behavior.

In reef-building coral and sea anemones, they fluoresce; light is absorbed at one wavelength, and re-emitted at another. These pigments may act as natural sunscreens, aid in photosynthesis, serve as warning coloration, attract mates, warn rivals, or confuse predators.

==== Chromatophores ====
Chromatophores are color pigment changing cells that are directly stimulated by central motor neurons. They are primarily used for quick environmental adaptation for camouflaging. The process of changing the color pigment of their skin relies on a single highly developed chromatophore cell and many muscles, nerves, glial and sheath cells. Chromatophores contract and contain vesicles that stores three different liquid pigments. Each color is indicated by the three types of chromatophore cells: erythrophores, melanophores, and xanthophores. The first type is the erythrophores, which contains reddish pigments such as carotenoids and pteridines. The second type is the melanophores, which contains black and brown pigments such as the melanins. The third type is the xanthophores which contains yellow pigments in the forms of carotenoids. The various colors are made by the combination of the different layers of the chromatophores. These cells are usually located beneath the skin or scale the animals. There are two categories of colors generated by the cell – biochromes and schematochromes. Biochromes are colors chemically formed microscopic, natural pigments. Their chemical composition is created to take in some color of light and reflect the rest. In contrast, schematochromes (structural colors) are colors created by light reflections from a colorless surface and refractions by tissues. Schematochromes act like prisms, refracting and dispersing visible light to the surroundings, which will eventually reflect a specific combination of colors. These categories are determined by the movement of pigments within the chromatophores. The physiological color changes are short-term and fast, found in fishes, and are a result from an animal's response to a change in the environment. In contrast, the morphological color changes are long-term changes, occurs in different stages of the animal, and are due to the change of numbers of chromatophores. To change the color pigments, transparency, or opacity, the cells alter in form and size, and stretch or contract their outer covering.

==== Photo-protective pigments ====
Due to damage from UV-A and UV-B, marine animals have evolved to have compounds that absorb UV light and act as sunscreen. Mycosporine-like amino acids (MAAs) can absorb UV rays at 310-360 nm. Melanin is another well-known UV-protector. Carotenoids and photopigments both indirectly act as photo-protective pigments, as they quench oxygen free-radicals. They also supplement photosynthetic pigments that absorb light energy in the blue region.

==== Defensive role of pigments ====
It's known that animals use their color patterns to warn off predators, however it has been observed that a sponge pigment mimicked a chemical which involved the regulation of moulting of an amphipod that was known to prey on sponges. So whenever that amphipod eats the sponge, the chemical pigments prevents the moulting, and the amphipod eventually dies.

==== Environmental influence on color ====
Coloration in invertebrates varies based on the depth, water temperature, food source, currents, geographic location, light exposure, and sedimentation. For example, the amount of carotenoid a certain sea anemone decreases as we go deeper into the ocean. Thus, the marine life that resides on deeper waters is less brilliant than the organisms that live in well-lit areas due to the reduction of pigments. In the colonies of the colonial ascidian-cyanophyte symbiosis Trididemnum solidum, their colors are different depending on the light regime in which they live. The colonies that are exposed to full sunlight are heavily calcified, thicker, and are white. In contrast the colonies that live in shaded areas have more phycoerythrin (pigment that absorbs green) in comparison to phycocyanin (pigment that absorbs red), thinner, and are purple. The purple color in the shaded colonies are mainly due to the phycobilin pigment of the algae, meaning the variation of exposure in light changes the colors of these colonies.

==== Adaptive coloration ====
Aposematism is the warning coloration to signal potential predators to stay away. In many chromodorid nudibranchs, they take in distasteful and toxic chemicals emitted from sponges and store them in their repugnatorial glands (located around the mantle edge). Predators of nudibranchs have learned to avoid these certain nudibranchs based on their bright color patterns. Preys also protect themselves by their toxic compounds ranging from a variety of organic and inorganic compounds.

==== Physiological activities ====
Pigments of marine animals serve several different purposes, other than defensive roles. Some pigments are known to protect against UV (see photo-protective pigments.) In the nudibranch Nembrotha Kubaryana, tetrapyrrole pigment 13 has been found to be a potent antimicrobial agent. Also in this creature, tamjamines A, B, C, E, and F has shown antimicrobial, antitumor, and immunosuppressive activities.

Sesquiterpenoids are recognized for their blue and purple colors, but it has also been reported to exhibit various bioactivities such as antibacterial, immunoregulating, antimicrobial, and cytotoxic, as well as the inhibitory activity against cell division in the fertilized sea urchin and ascidian eggs. Several other pigments have been shown to be cytotoxic. In fact, two new carotenoids that were isolated from a sponge called Phakellia stelliderma showed mild cytotoxicity against mouse leukemia cells. Other pigments with medical involvements include scytonemin, topsentins, and debromohymenialdisine have several lead compounds in the field of inflammation, rheumatoid arthritis and osteoarthritis respectively. There's evidence that topsentins are potent mediators of immunogenic inflation, and topsentin and scytonemin are potent inhibitors of neurogenic inflammation.

== Uses ==
Pigments may be extracted and used as dyes.

Pigments (such as astaxanthin and lycopene) are used as dietary supplements.

== See also ==
- Photosynthetic pigment
- Human skin color
