= C33H38N4O6 =

The molecular formula C_{33}H_{38}N_{4}O_{6} (molar mass: 586.67 g/mol) may refer to:

- Irinotecan, a drug used for the treatment of cancer
- Phycocyanobilin, a blue phycobilin
- Phycoerythrobilin, a red phycobilin
