= Time-resolved fluorescence energy transfer =

Type of energy transfer

Time-resolved fluorescence energy transfer (TR-FRET) is the practical combination of time-resolved fluorometry (TRF) with Förster resonance energy transfer (FRET) that offers a powerful tool for drug discovery researchers. TR-FRET combines the low background aspect of TRF with the homogeneous assay format of FRET. The resulting assay provides an increase in flexibility, reliability and sensitivity in addition to higher throughput and fewer false positive/false negative results. FRET involves two fluorophores, a donor and an acceptor. Excitation of the donor by an energy source (e.g. flash lamp or laser) produces an energy transfer to the acceptor if the two are within a given proximity to each other. The acceptor in turn emits light at its characteristic wavelength.

The FRET aspect of the technology is driven by several factors, including spectral overlap and the proximity of the fluorophores involved, wherein energy transfer occurs only when the distance between the donor and the acceptor is small enough. In practice, FRET systems are characterized by the Förster's radius (R_{0}): the distance between the fluorophores at which FRET efficiency is 50%. For many FRET fluorophore pairs, R_{0} lies between 20 and 90 Å, depending on the acceptor used and the spatial arrangements of the fluorophores within the assay. Through measurement of this energy transfer, interactions between biomolecules can be assessed by coupling each partner with a fluorescent label and detecting the level of energy transfer. Acceptor emission as a measure of energy transfer can be detected without needing to separate bound from unbound assay components (e.g. a filtration or wash step) resulting in reduced assay time and cost.

== Advantages ==
Homogeneous, mix-and-read TR-FRET assays offer advantages over other biomolecular screening assays, such as fluorescence polarization (FP) or TRF assays. In FP assays, background fluorescence due to library compounds is normally unpolarized and background signal due to scattered light (e.g. precipitated compounds) is normally polarized. Depending on the assay configuration, either case can lead to a false positive or false negative result. However, because the donor species used in a TR-FRET assay has a fluorescent lifetime that is many orders of magnitude longer than background fluorescence or scattered light, emission signal resulting from energy transfer can be measured after any interfering signal has completely decayed. TR-FRET assays can also be formatted to use limiting receptor and excess tracer concentrations (unlike FP assays), which can provide further cost savings. In the case of TRF assays, a wash step is required to remove unbound fluorescent reagents prior to measuring the activity signal of the assay. This increases reagent use, time to complete the assay, and limits the ability to miniaturize the system (e.g. converting from a 384-well microtiter plate to a 1536-well plate). TR-FRET assays take advantage of the required proximity of the donor and acceptor species for generation of signal.

Additionally, this method is preferred by some researchers as it does not rely on radioactive materials to generate the signal to be detected. This avoids both the hazards of using the materials and the cost and logistics of storage, use, and disposal.

== Components ==
Although TR-FRET can be accomplished with a variety of fluorophore combinations, lanthanide metals are particularly useful. Certain life science applications take advantage of the unique fluorescence properties of lanthanide ion complexes (Ln(III) chelates or cryptates). These are well-suited for this application due to their large Stokes shifts and extremely long emission lifetimes (from microseconds to milliseconds) compared to more traditional fluorophores (e.g. fluorescein, allophycoyanin, phycoerythrin, and rhodamine). The biological fluids or serum commonly used in these research applications contain many compounds and proteins which are naturally fluorescent. Therefore, the use of conventional, steady-state fluorescence measurement presents serious limitations in assay sensitivity. Long-lived fluorophores, such as lanthanides, combined with time-resolved detection (a delay between excitation and emission detection) minimizes prompt fluorescence interference. This method (commonly referred to as time-resolved fluorometry or TRF) involves two fluorophores: a donor and an acceptor. Excitation of the donor fluorophore (in this case, the lanthanide ion complex) by an energy source (e.g. flash lamp or laser) produces an energy transfer to the acceptor fluorophore if they are within a given proximity to each other (known as the Förster's radius). The acceptor fluorophore in turn emits light at its characteristic wavelength. The two most commonly used lanthanides in life science assays are shown below along with their corresponding acceptor dye as well as their excitation and emission wavelengths and resultant Stokes shift (separation of excitation and emission wavelengths).

=== Common lanthanide donor-acceptor pairings ===
Donor	Excitation⇒Emission λ (nm)	Acceptor	Excitation⇒Emission λ (nm)	Stokes Shift (nm) (donor excitation ⇒ acceptor emission)
Europium^{3+}	340⇒615	Allophycocyanin	615⇒660	320
Terbium^{3+}	340⇒545	Phycoerythrin	545⇒575	235

=== TR-FRET example ===
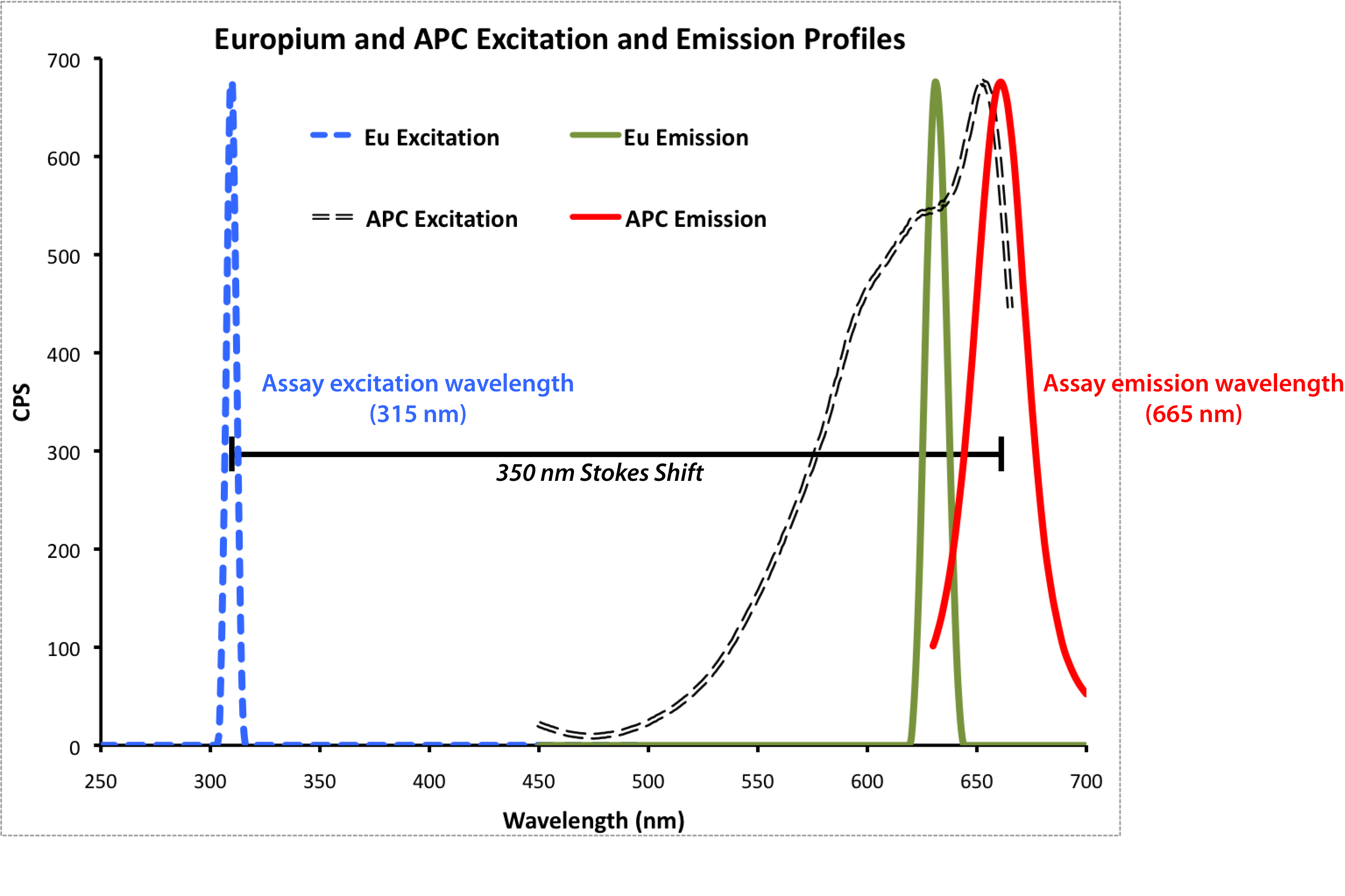
Spectral overlay of excitation and emission profiles of Europium and Allophycocyanin labeled with Stokes shift and excitation and emission wavelengths to illustrate the separation of wavelengths possible in some TR-FRET assays.

As noted in the table above, fluorescent energy transfer from Europium to allophycocyanin can be used in a time resolved manner, particularly in biomolecular screening assays. The figure at right shows the intersection of the emission from Europium with the excitation of allophycocyanin (APC) where energy transfer occurs when Europium and APC are brought into proximity via biomolecular interactions.

When these two fluorophores are brought together by a biomolecular interaction, a portion of the energy captured by the Europium during excitation is released through fluorescence emission at 620 nm, while the remaining energy is transferred to the APC. This energy is then released by APC as specific fluorescence at 665 nm only via FRET with Europium.

Through the design of the high-throughput screening assay, the materials are mixed, and if the enzyme does act on the peptide, all components will bind their respective targets and FRET will occur.

The instrument used to measure the assay then delays the reading of the emitted light by several hundred milliseconds after the incident/excitation light (the light energy pulse supplied by the instrument to excite the donor molecule) in order to eliminate any 'cross-talk' between the excitation and emission signals. ('cross-talk' in this instance refers to overlapping spectral profiles, which could result in false-positives, false-negatives, or reduced sensitivity depending on the assay design.) This process comprises the 'time-resolved' aspect of the assay.
