= C33H42N4O6 =

The molecular formula C_{33}H_{42}N_{4}O_{6} (molar mass: 590.71 g/mol, exact mass: 590.310435 u) may refer to:

- Phycourobilin, a tetrapyrrole
- Urobilin, a tetrapyrrole
