= Phycourobilin =

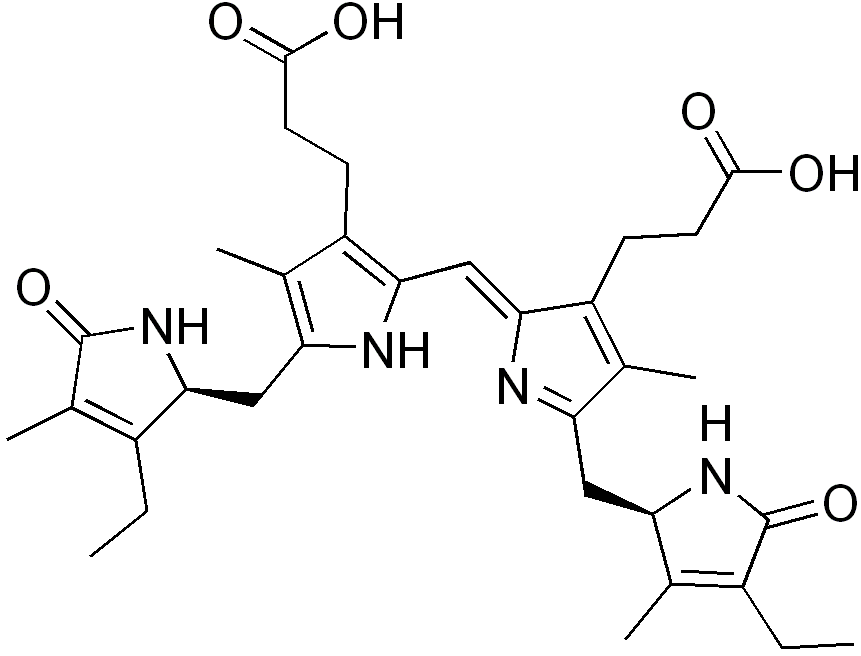

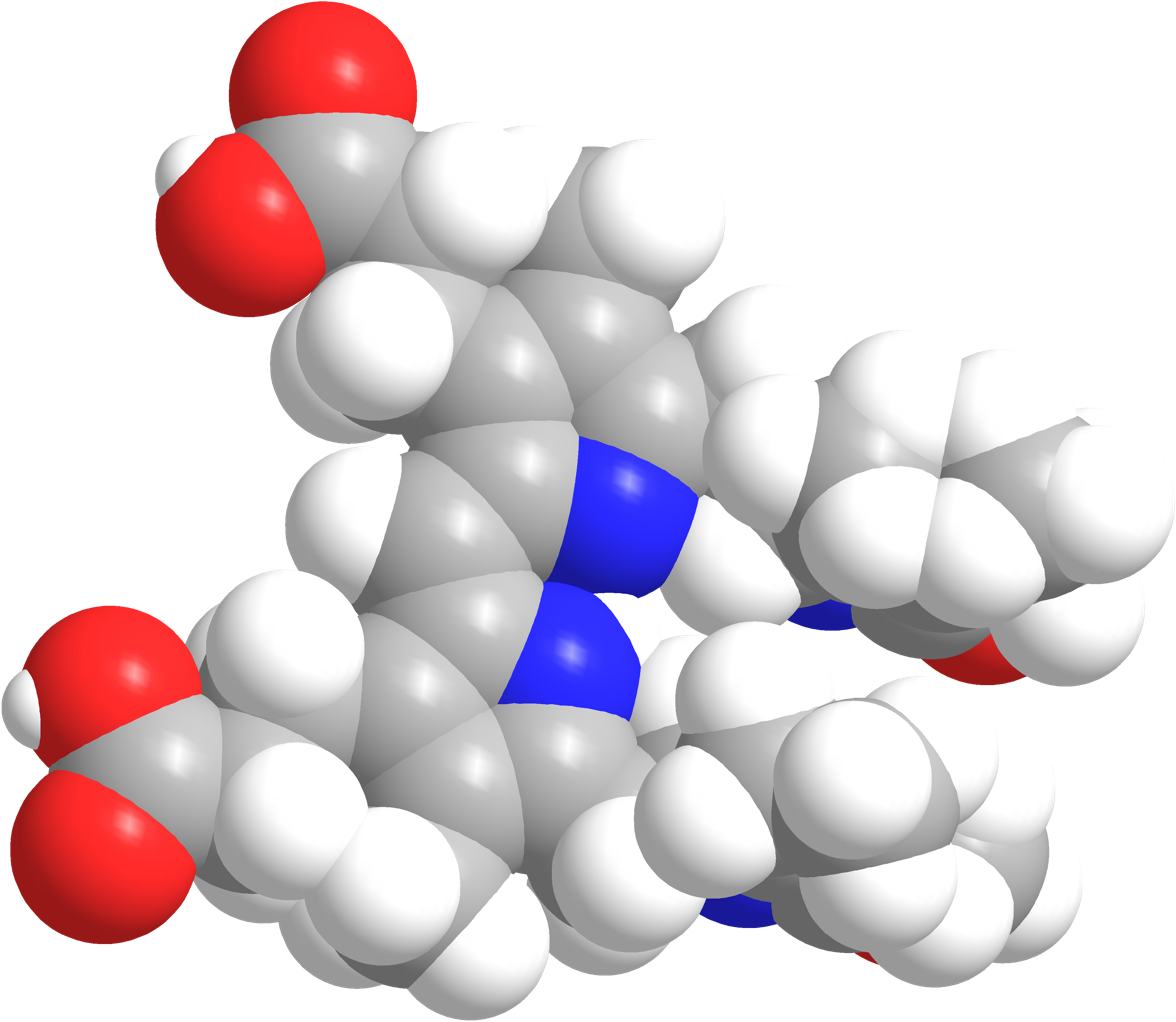

Names
- IUPAC name 3-[2-[(Z)-[3-(2-carboxyethyl)-5-[ [(2R)-4-ethyl-3-methyl-5-oxo-1,2-dihydropyrrol-2-yl]methyl]-4-methyl-2-pyrrolylidene]methyl]-5-[ [(2S)-3-ethyl-4-methyl-5-oxo-1,2-dihydropyrrol-2-yl]methyl]-4-methyl-1H-pyrrol-3-yl]propanoic acid

Identifiers
CAS Number	121734-26-7
3D model (JSmol)	Interactive image
ChEBI	CHEBI:45097
ChemSpider	4451232
PubChem CID	5289229
UNII	446YNT6QXL
CompTox Dashboard (EPA)	DTXSID80905084
- InChI: InChI=1S/C33H42N4O6/c1-7-20-19(6)32(42)37-27(20)14-25-18(5)23(10-12-31(40)41)29(35-25)15-28-22(9-11-30(38)39)17(4)24(34-28)13-26-16(3)21(8-2)33(43)36-26/h15,26-27,35H,7-14H2,1-6H3,(H,36,43)(H,37,42)(H,38,39)(H,40,41)/b28-15-/t26-,27+/m1/s1 Key: KDCCOOGTVSRCHX-YYVBKQGDSA-N; InChI=1/C33H42N4O6/c1-7-20-19(6)32(42)37-27(20)14-25-18(5)23(10-12-31(40)41)29(35-25)15-28-22(9-11-30(38)39)17(4)24(34-28)13-26-16(3)21(8-2)33(43)36-26/h15,26-27,35H,7-14H2,1-6H3,(H,36,43)(H,37,42)(H,38,39)(H,40,41)/b28-15-/t26-,27+/m1/s1 Key: KDCCOOGTVSRCHX-YYVBKQGDBH
- SMILES: CCC1=C(C(=O)N[C@H]1CC2=C(C(=C(N2)\C=C/3\C(=C(C(=N3)C[C@@H]4C(=C(C(=O)N4)CC)C)C)CCC(=O)O)CCC(=O)O)C)C

Properties
Chemical formula	C_{33}H_{42}N_{4}O_{6}
Molar mass	590.71
- Except where otherwise noted, data are given for materials in their standard state (at 25 °C [77 °F], 100 kPa). Infobox references

Phycourobilin is an orange tetrapyrrole involved in photosynthesis in cyanobacteria and red algae. This chromophore is bound to the phycobiliprotein phycoerythrin, the distal component of the light-harvesting system of cyanobacteria and red algae (phycobilisome).

When bound to phycoerythrin, phycourobilin shows an absorption maximum around 495 nm. This chromophore is always a donor chromophore of phycoerythrins, since their acceptor chromophore is always phycoerythrobilin. It can also be linked to the linker polypeptides of the phycobilisome, in which its precise role remains unclear.

Phycourobilin is found in marine phycobilisome containing organisms, allowing them to efficiently absorb blue-green light. In the ubiquitous marine cyanobacteria Synechococcus, the amount of phycourobilin in the phycobilisomes is correlated to the ecological niche the cells inhabit: offshore Synechococcus are quite phycourobililin-rich, while coastal Synechococcus contain very little or no phycourobilin. This represents a remarkable adaptation of the cyanobacterial light-harvesting system, as oceanic waters are relatively richer in blue light than onshore waters.
