= Phycobilin =

Light-capturing molecules in algae

Phycocyanobilin, a common phycobilin found in cyanobacteria and some algae

Phycobilins (from Greek: φύκος (phykos) meaning "alga", and from Latin: bilis meaning "bile") are light-capturing bilins found in cyanobacteria and in the chloroplasts of red algae, glaucophytes and some cryptomonads (though not in green algae and plants). Most of their molecules consist of a chromophore which makes them coloured. They are unique among the photosynthetic pigments in that they are bonded to certain water-soluble proteins, known as phycobiliproteins. Phycobiliproteins then pass the light energy to chlorophylls for photosynthesis.

The phycobilins are especially efficient at absorbing red, orange, yellow, and green light (in the range 520 to 630 nm), wave lengths that are not well absorbed by chlorophyll a. Organisms growing in shallow waters tend to contain phycobilins that can capture yellow/red light, while those at greater depth often contain more of the phycobilins that can capture green light, which is relatively more abundant there.

The phycobilins fluoresce at a particular wavelength, and are, therefore, often used in research as chemical tags, e.g., by binding phycobiliproteins to antibodies in a technique known as immunofluorescence.

== Types ==
There are four types of phycobilins:

1. Phycoerythrobilin, which is red
2. Phycourobilin, which is orange
3. Phycoviolobilin (also known as phycobiliviolin) found in phycoerythrocyanin
4. Phycocyanobilin (also known as phycobiliverdin), which is blue.

They can be found in different combinations attached to phycobiliproteins to confer specific spectroscopic properties.

== Structural relation to other molecules ==
In chemical terms, phycobilins consist of an open chain of four pyrrole rings (tetrapyrrole) and are structurally similar to the bile pigment bilirubin, which explains the name. (Bilirubin's conformation is also affected by light, a fact used for the phototherapy of jaundiced newborns.) Phycobilins are also closely related to the chromophores of the light-detecting plant pigment phytochrome, which also consist of an open chain of four pyrroles. Chlorophylls are composed of four pyrroles as well, but there the pyrroles are arranged in a ring and contain a metal atom in the center of it.
