= Phycocyanobilin =

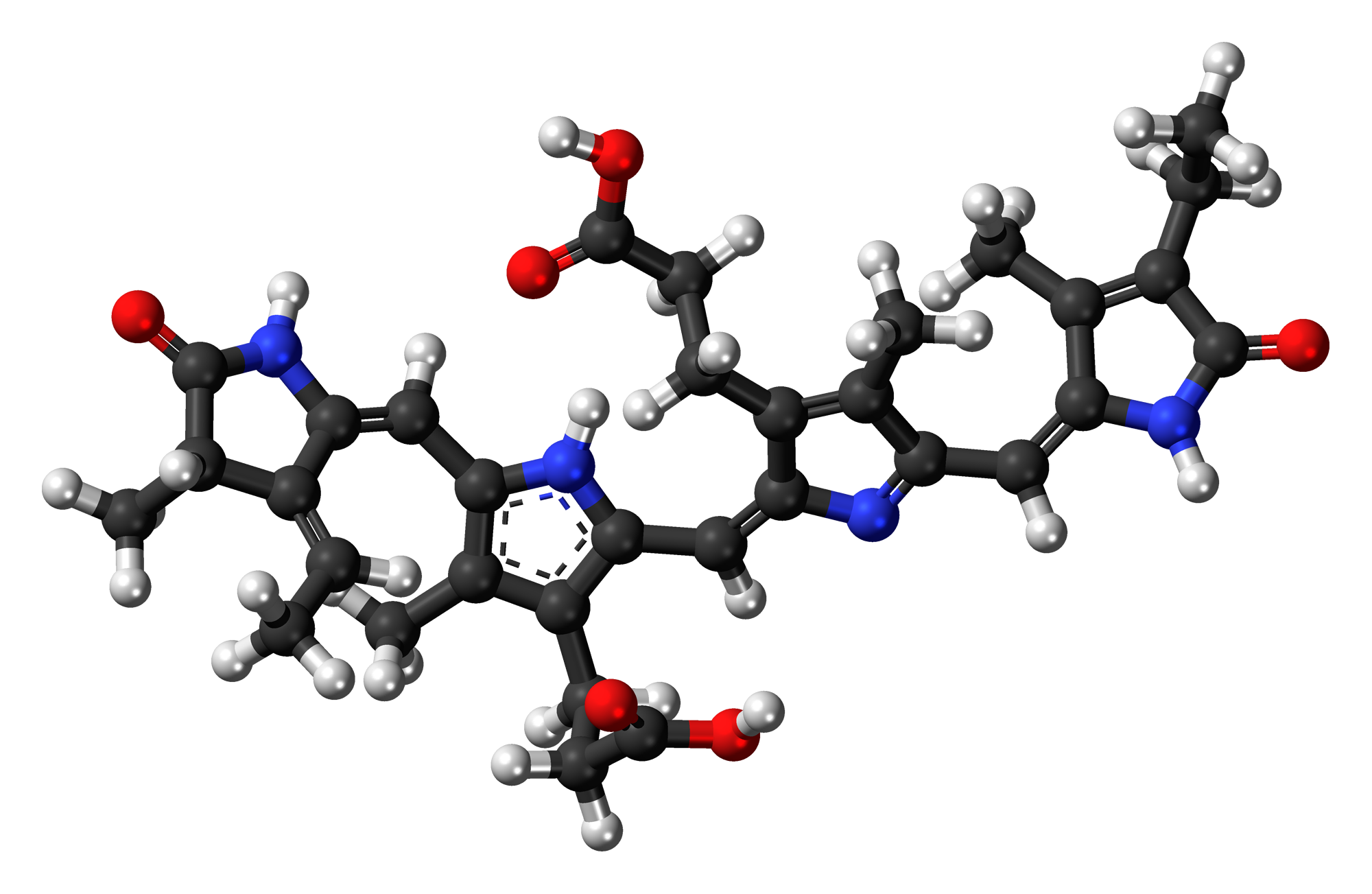

Names
- IUPAC name (2R,3E)-18-ethyl-3-ethylidene-1,2,3,19,22,24-hexahydro-2,7,13,17-tetramethyl-1,19-dioxo-21H-biline-8,12-dipropanoic acid

Identifiers
CAS Number	20298-86-6
3D model (JSmol)	Interactive image
Beilstein Reference	4285356
ChEBI	CHEBI:48863
ChemSpider	16736730
PubChem CID	5460417
UNII	36NUT04V2K
CompTox Dashboard (EPA)	DTXSID401107685
- InChI: InChI=1S/C33H38N4O6/c1-7-20-19(6)32(42)37-27(20)14-25-18(5)23(10-12-31(40)41)29(35-25)15-28-22(9-11-30(38)39)17(4)24(34-28)13-26-16(3)21(8-2)33(43)36-26/h7,13-15,19,35H,8-12H2,1-6H3,(H,36,43)(H,37,42)(H,38,39)(H,40,41)/b20-7+,26-13-,27-14-,28-15-/t19-/m1/s1 Key: INPDFIMLLXXDOQ-UAWLBFNISA-N
- SMILES: C/C=C1C(=C/c2[nH]c(/C=C3\N=C(/C=C4\NC(=O)C(CC)=C4C)C(C)=C3CCC(=O)O)c(CCC(=O)O)c2C)/NC(=O)[C@@H]/1C

Properties
Chemical formula	C_{33}H_{38}N_{4}O_{6}
Molar mass	586.69 g/mol
- Except where otherwise noted, data are given for materials in their standard state (at 25 °C [77 °F], 100 kPa). Infobox references

Phycocyanobilin is a blue phycobilin, i.e., a tetrapyrrole chromophore found in cyanobacteria and in the chloroplasts of red algae, glaucophytes, and some cryptomonads. Phycocyanobilin is present only in the phycobiliproteins allophycocyanin and phycocyanin, of which it is the terminal acceptor of energy. It is covalently linked to these phycobiliproteins by a thioether bond.

Phycocyanobilin (PCB), has the ability to bind to human serum albumin (HSA), protein found mainly in the blood of humans. This PCB-HCA complex benefits the structure of HSA, increasing the thermal stability of HSA, as well as increasing its ability to prevent against proteolytic activity of other proteins.

== Biosynthetic Pathway ==
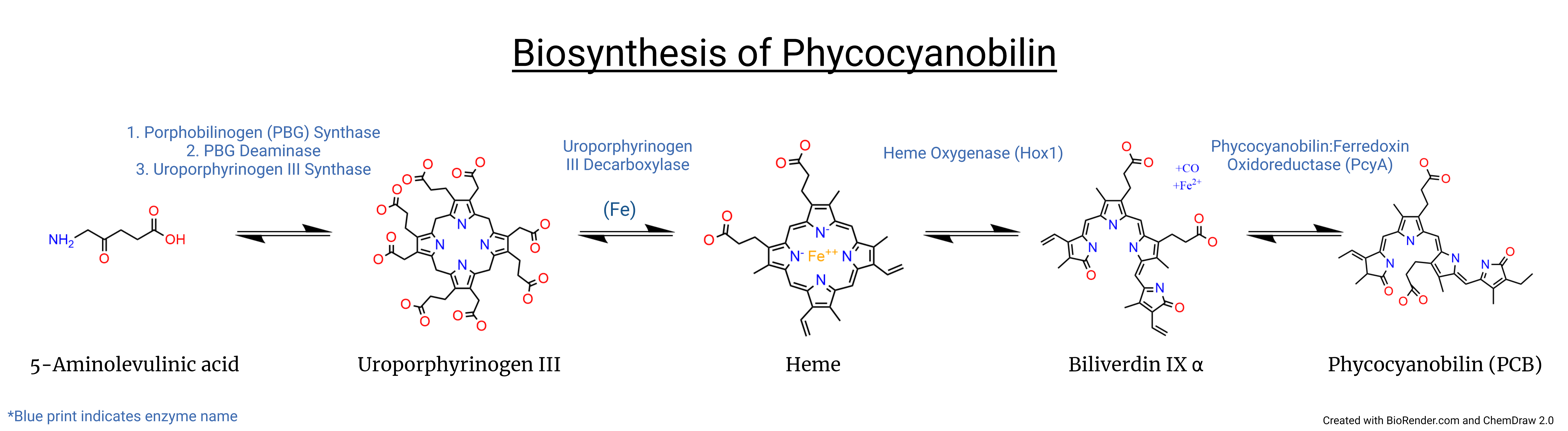
Scheme illustrating the different steps of the biosynthesis of phycocyanobilin

The biosynthetic pathway of phycocyanobilin begins with 5-aminolevulinic acid (5-ALA). Two molecules of 5-ALA undergo a condensation reaction catalyzed by porphobilinogen synthase to yield a molecule of porphobilinogen (PBG) (not shown). Four molecules of PBG are polymerized into a linear tetrapyrrole by porphobilinogen deaminase. This reaction releases four ammonia molecules in the process. Completion of the tetrapyrrole is performed by uroporphyrinogen III synthase which results in the macrocyclic Uroporphyrinogen III. Uroporphyrinogen III is then converted to a heme by uroporphyrinogen III decarboxylase. The heme molecule is converted to biliverdin. This is reduced to phycocyanobilin by phycocyanobilin:ferredoxin oxidoreductase PcyA.

== Biological role ==
Phycocyanobilin is a component of phycobilisome protein complexes, the light-harvesting antennae that transmit the energy of photons to photosystem II and photosystem I in cyanobacteria and in the chloroplasts of red algae and glaucophytes. The absorption spectrum of phycocyanobilin in the 500–650 nm range where chlorophyll absorbs poorly allows organisms such as Galdieria sulphuraria which use it to be more efficient.

The tetrapyrrole is covalently attached to the phycobiliprotein through a bond between the sulfur of a cysteine amino-acid and the ring-C=CCH_{3} sidechain, as a thioether.

== Uses ==
Phycocyanobilin and the related phycoerythrobilins, in the form of phycobiliproteins, are widely used in foodstuffs and cosmetics as colourants. They are mainly obtained from Spirulina species.
