= Phycobilisome =

Light-energy harvesting structure in cyanobacteria and red algae

Phycobilisome protein
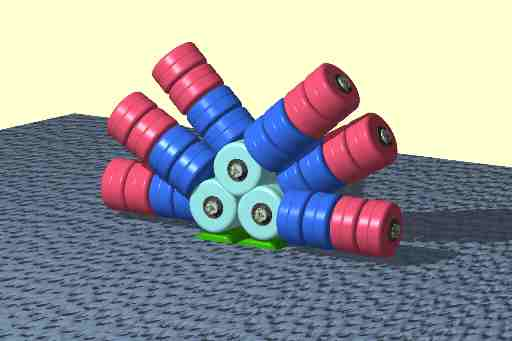
- The layout of protein subunits in a phycobilisome.

Identifiers
- Symbol: Phycobilisome
- Pfam: PF00502
- InterPro: IPR012128
- SCOP2: 1cpc / SCOPe / SUPFAM
Available protein structures:
- PDB: IPR012128 PF00502 (ECOD; PDBsum)
- AlphaFold: IPR012128; PF00502

Phycobilisomes are light-harvesting antennae that transmit the energy of harvested photons to photosystem II and photosystem I in cyanobacteria and in the chloroplasts of red algae and glaucophytes. They were lost during the evolution of the chloroplasts of green algae and plants.

== General structure ==
Phycobilisomes are protein complexes (up to 600 polypeptides) anchored to thylakoid membranes. They are made of stacks of chromophorylated proteins, the phycobiliproteins, and their associated linker polypeptides. Each phycobilisome consists of a core made of allophycocyanin, from which several outwardly oriented rods made of stacked disks of phycocyanin and (if present) phycoerythrin(s) or phycoerythrocyanin. The spectral property of phycobiliproteins are mainly dictated by their prosthetic groups, which are linear tetrapyrroles known as phycobilins including phycocyanobilin, phycoerythrobilin, phycourobilin and phycobiliviolin. The spectral properties of a given phycobilin are influenced by its protein environment.

== Function ==
Each phycobiliprotein has a specific absorption and fluorescence emission maximum in the visible range of light. Therefore, their presence and the particular arrangement within the phycobilisomes allow absorption and unidirectional transfer of light energy to chlorophyll a of the photosystem II. In this way, the cells take advantage of the available wavelengths of light (in the 500–650 nm range), which are inaccessible to chlorophyll, and utilize their energy for photosynthesis. This is particularly advantageous deeper in the water column, where light with longer wavelengths is less transmitted and therefore less available directly to chlorophyll.

The geometrical arrangement of a phycobilisome is very elegant in an antenna-like assembly. It results in 95% efficiency of energy transfer.

== Evolution and diversity ==
There are many variations to the general phycobilisome structure. Their shape can be hemidiscoidal (in cyanobacteria) or hemiellipsoidal (in red algae). Species lacking phycoerythrin have at least two disks of phycocyanin per rod, which is sufficient for maximum photosynthesis.

The phycobiliproteins themselves show little sequence evolution due to their highly constrained function (absorption and transfer of specific wavelengths). In some species of cyanobacteria, when both phycocyanin and phycoerythrin is present, the phycobilisome can undergo significant restructuring as response to light color. In green light the distal portions of the rods are made of red colored phycoerythrin, which absorbs green light better. In red light, this is replaced by blue colored phycocyanin, which absorbs red light better. This reversible process is known as complementary chromatic adaptation. It is the component of photosynthetic system of cyanobacteria, as a particle with which various structures are linked (i.e. thylakoid membrane, etc.).

== Applications ==
Phycobilisomes can be used in prompt fluorescence, flow cytometry, Western blotting and protein microarrays. Some phycobilisomes have an absorption and emission profile similar to Cy5, allowing them to be used in many of the same applications. They can also be up to 200 times brighter and with a larger Stokes shift, providing a larger signal per binding event. This property allows the detection of low-level target molecules or rare events.

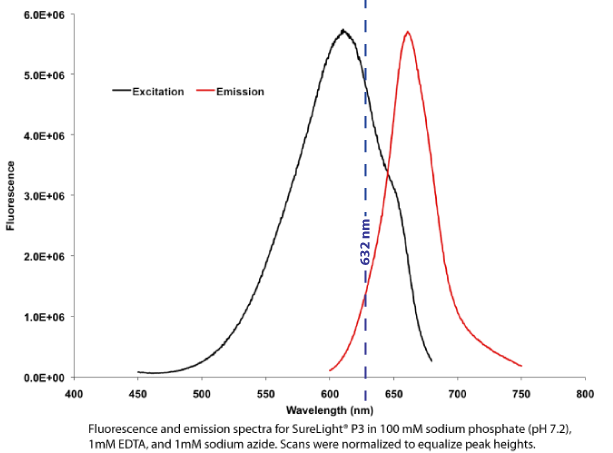
Excitation and emission spectra of a phycobilisome from a blue-green alga.

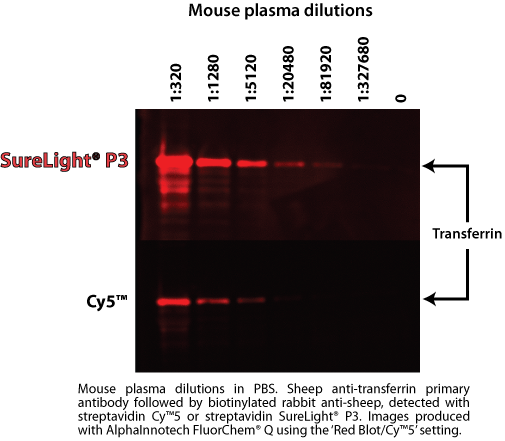
Phycobilisome versus cyanine dye detection capabilities in Western blot application.
