= Phycoerythrocyanin =

Chemical compound

Phycoerythrocyanin is a kind of phycobiliprotein, a magenta chromoprotein involved in photosynthesis of some Cyanobacteria. This chromoprotein consists of alpha- and beta-subunits, generally aggregated as a hexamer. Alpha-phycoerythrocyanin contains a phycoviolobilin, a violet bilin, that covalently attached at Cys-84, and beta-phycoerythrocyanin contains two phycocyanobilins, a blue bilin, that is covalently attached at Cys-84 and -155, respectively. Phycoerythrocyanin is similar to phycocyanin, an important component of the light-harvesting complex (phycobilisome) of cyanobacteria and red algae.

While only phycocyanobilin is covalently bound to phycocyanin, leading to an absorption maximum around 620 nm, phycoerythrocyanin containing both phycoviolobilin and phycocyanobilin leads to an absorption maximum around 575 nm. As both phycoerythrocyanin and phycocyanin have phycocyanobilin acting as the terminal acceptor of energy transfer, they fluoresce around 635 nm, which is absorbed by allophycocyanins that have maximal absorption around 650 nm and maximal fluorescence around 670 nm. Finally, the light energy absorbed by phycoerythrocyanin is transferred to photosynthetic reaction center.
