= Accessory pigment =

Accessory pigments are light-absorbing compounds, found in photosynthetic organisms, that work in conjunction with chlorophyll a. They include other forms of this pigment, such as chlorophyll b in green algal and vascular ("higher") plant antennae, while other algae may contain chlorophyll c or d. In addition, there are many non-chlorophyll accessory pigments, such as carotenoids or phycobiliproteins, which also absorb light and transfer that light energy to photosystem chlorophyll. Some of these accessory pigments, in particular the carotenoids, also serve to absorb and dissipate excess light energy, or work as antioxidants. The large, physically associated group of chlorophylls and other accessory pigments is sometimes referred to as a pigment bed.

The different chlorophyll and non-chlorophyll pigments associated with the photosystems all have different absorption spectra, either because the spectra of the different chlorophyll pigments are modified by their local protein environment or because the accessory pigments have intrinsic structural differences. The result is that, in vivo, a composite absorption spectrum of all these pigments is broadened and flattened such that a wider range of visible and infrared radiation is absorbed by plants and algae. Most photosynthetic organisms do not absorb green light well, thus most remaining light under leaf canopies in forests or under water with abundant plankton is green, a spectral effect called the "green window". Organisms such as some cyanobacteria and red algae contain accessory phycobiliproteins that absorb green light reaching these habitats.

In aquatic ecosystems, it is likely that the absorption spectrum of water, along with gilvin and tripton (dissolved and particulate organic matter, respectively), determines phototrophic niche differentiation. The six shoulders in the light absorption of water between wavelengths 400 and 1100 nm correspond to troughs in the collective absorption of at least twenty diverse species of phototrophic bacteria. Another effect is due to the overall trend for water to absorb low frequencies, while gilvin and tripton absorb higher ones. This is why open ocean appears blue and supports yellow species such as Prochlorococcus, which contains divinyl-chlorophyll a and b. Synechococcus, colored red with phycoerythrin, is adapted to coastal bodies, while phycocyanin allows Cyanobacteria to thrive in darker inland waters.

== See also ==
- Action spectrum
