= Phycoerythrin =

Protein-pigment complex

Phycoerythrin, alpha/beta chain

Identifiers
- Symbol: Phycoerythr_ab
- Pfam: PF02972
- InterPro: IPR004228
- SCOP2: 1qgw / SCOPe / SUPFAM
Available protein structures:
- Pfam: structures / ECOD
- PDB: RCSB PDB; PDBe; PDBj
- PDBsum: structure summary

Phycoerythrin (PE) is a red protein-pigment complex from the light-harvesting phycobiliprotein family, present in cyanobacteria, red algae and cryptophytes, accessory to the main chlorophyll pigments responsible for photosynthesis.The red pigment is due to the prosthetic group, phycoerythrobilin, which gives phycoerythrin its red color.

Like all phycobiliproteins, it is composed of a protein part covalently binding chromophores called phycobilins. In the phycoerythrin family, the most known phycobilins are: phycoerythrobilin, the typical phycoerythrin acceptor chromophore. Phycoerythrobilin is a linear tetrapyrrole molecule found in cyanobacteria, red algae, and cryptomonads. Together with other bilins such as phycocyanobilin it serves as a light-harvesting pigment in the photosynthetic light-harvesting structures of cyanobacteria called phycobilisomes. Phycoerythrins are composed of (αβ) monomers, usually organised in a disk-shaped trimer (αβ)_{3} or hexamer (αβ)_{6} (second one is the functional unit of the antenna rods). These typical complexes also contain a third type of subunit, the γ chain.

== Phycobilisomes ==
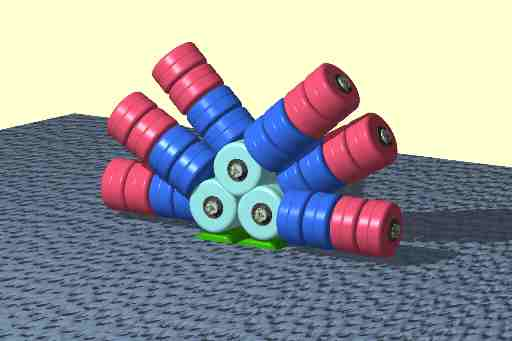
Phycobiliproteins (like phycoerythrin) usually form rods of stacked disks in phycobilisomes.

Phycobiliproteins are part of huge light harvesting antennae protein complexes called phycobilisomes. In red algae they are anchored to the stromal side of thylakoid membranes of chloroplasts, whereas in cryptophytes phycobilisomes are reduced and (phycobiliprotein 545 PE545 molecules here) are densely packed inside the lumen of thylakoides.

Phycobiliproteins have many practical application to them including imperative properties like hepato-protective, anti-oxidants, anti-inflammatory and anti-aging activity of PBPs enable their use in food, cosmetics, pharmaceutical and biomedical industries. PBPs have been also noted to show beneficial effect in therapeutics of some disease like Alzheimer and cancer.

Phycoerythrin is an accessory pigment to the main chlorophyll pigments responsible for photosynthesis. The light energy is captured by phycoerythrin and is then passed on to the reaction centre chlorophyll pair, most of the time via the phycobiliproteins phycocyanin and allophycocyanin.

== Structural characteristics ==
Phycoerythrins except phycoerythrin 545 (PE545) are composed of (αβ) monomers assembled into disc-shaped (αβ)_{6} hexamers or (αβ)_{3} trimers with 32 or 3 symmetry and enclosing central channel. In phycobilisomes (PBS) each trimer or hexamer contains at least one linker protein located in central channel. B-phycoerythrin (B-PE) and R-phycoerythrin (R-PE) from red algae in addition to α and β chains have a third, γ subunit contributing both linker and light-harvesting functions, because it bears chromophores.

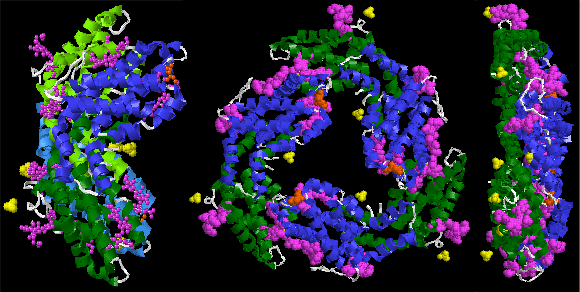
The crystal structure of B-phycoerythrin from red algae Porphyridium cruentum (PDB ID: 3V57). The asymmetric unit (αβ)_{2} on the left and assumed biological molecule (αβ)_{3}. It contains phycoerythrobilin, N-methyl asparagine and SO^{2−}_{4}.

R-phycoerythrin is predominantly produced by red algae. The protein is made up of at least three different subunits and varies according to the species of algae that produces it. The subunit structure of the most common R-PE is (αβ)_{6}γ. The α subunit has two phycoerythrobilins (PEB), the β subunit has 2 or 3 PEBs and one phycourobilin (PUB), while the different gamma subunits are reported to have 3 PEB and 2 PUB (γ_{1}) or 1 or 2 PEB and 1 PUB (γ_{2}). The molecular weight of R-PE is 250,000 daltons.

Crystal structures available in the Protein Data Bank contain in one (αβ)_{2} or (αβγ)_{2} asymmetric unit of different phycoerythrins:

Phycoerythrobilin is the typical chromophore in phycoerythrin. It is similar to porphyrin of chlorophyll for example, but tetrapyrrole is linear, not closed into ring with metal ion in the middle.

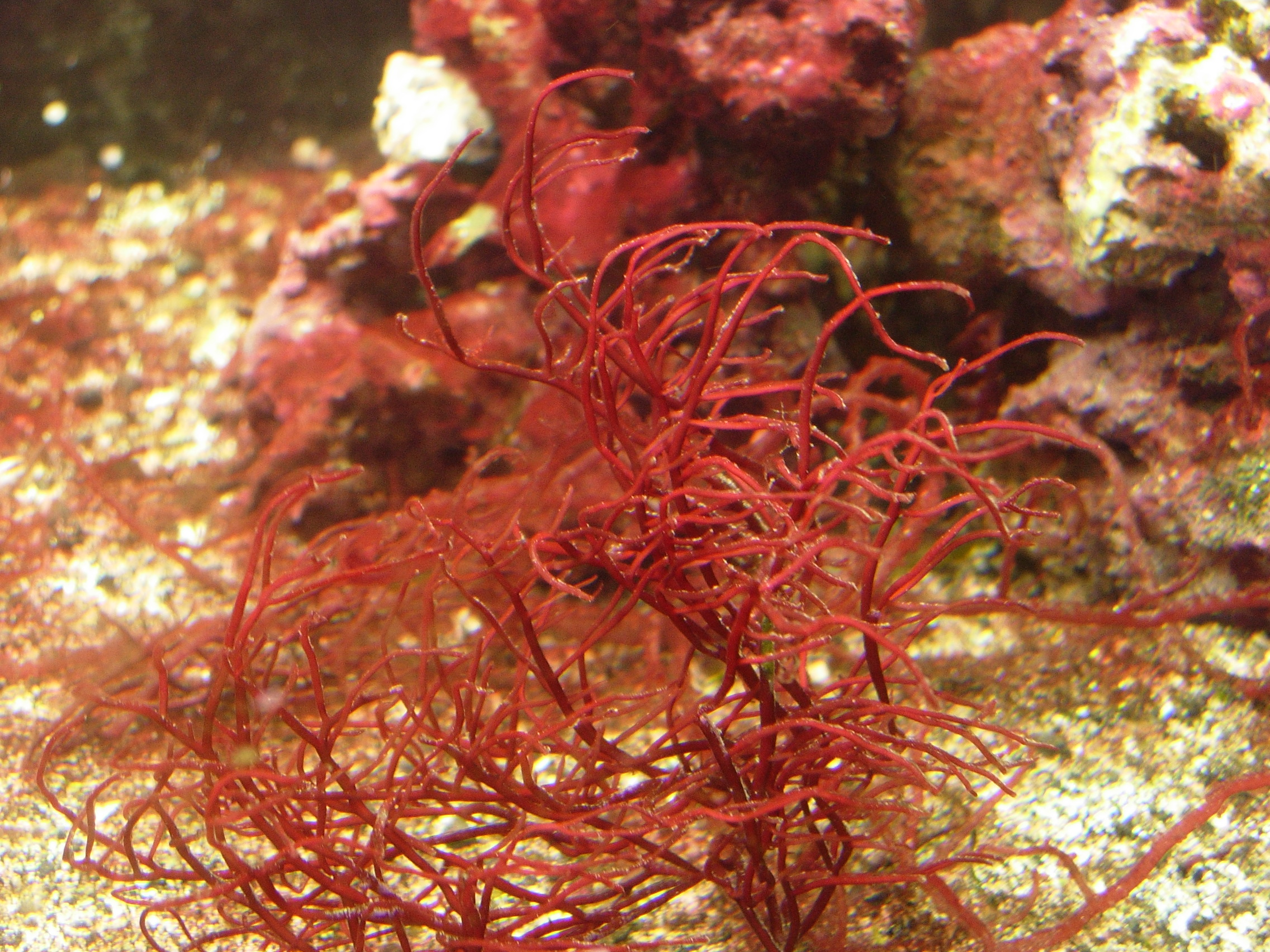
The red algae Gracilaria contains R-phycoerythrin.

Chromophore or other non-protein molecule	Phycoerythrin				Chain
Chromophore or other non-protein molecule	PE545	B-PE	R-PE	other types	Chain
Bilins	8	10	10	10	α and β
Phycoerythrobilin (PEB)	6	10	0 or 8	8	β (PE545) or α and β
15,16-dihydrobiliverdin (DBV)	2	—	—	—	α (-3 and -2)
Phycocyanobilin (CYC)	—	—	8 or 7 or 0	—	α and β
Biliverdine IX alpha (BLA)	—	—	0 or 1	—	α
Phycourobilin (PUB)	—	—	2	2	β
5-hydroxylysine (LYZ)	1 or 2	—	—	—	α (-3 or -3 and -2)
N-methyl asparagine (MEN)	2	2	0 or 2	2	β
Sulfate ion SO_{4}^{2−} (SO4)	—	5 or 1	0 or 2	—	α or α and β
Chloride ion Cl^{−} (CL)	1	—	—	—	β
Magnesium ion Mg^{2+} (MG)	2	—	—	—	α-3 and β
inspected PDB files	1XG0; 1XF6; 1QGW	3V57; 3V58	1EYX; 1LIA; 1B8D	2VJH	

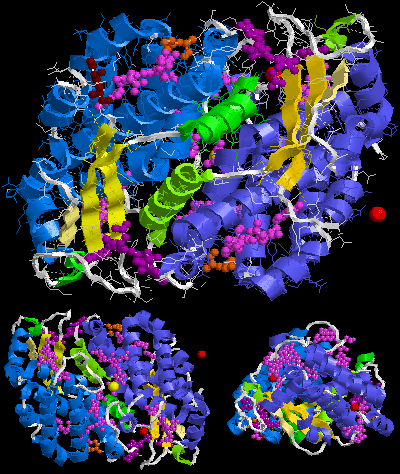
The crystal structure of phycoerythrin 545 (PE545) from a unicellular cryptophyte Rhodomonas CS24 (PDB ID: 1XG0). Colors: chains – alpha-2, alpha-3, beta, beta (helixes, sheets are yellow), phycoerythrobilin, 15,16-dihydrobiliverdin (15,16-DHBV), 5-hydroxylysine, N-methyl asparagine, Mg^{2+}, Cl^{−}.

The assumed biological molecule of phycoerythrin 545 (PE545) is (αβ)_{2} or rather (α_{3}β)(α_{2}β). The numbers 2 and 3 after the α letters in second formula are part of chain names here, not their counts. The synonym cryptophytan name of α_{3} chain is α_{1} chain.

The largest assembly of B-phycoerythrin (B-PE) is (αβ)_{3} trimer. However, preparations from red algae yield also (αβ)_{6} hexamer. In case of R-phycoerythrin (R-PE) the largest assumed biological molecule here is (αβγ)_{6}, (αβγ)_{3}(αβ)_{3} or (αβ)_{6} dependently on publication, for other phycoerythrin types (αβ)_{6}. These γ chains from the Protein Data Bank are very small and consist only of three or six recognizable amino acids, whereas described at the beginning of this section linker γ chain is large (for example 277 amino acid long 33 kDa in case of γ^{33} from red algae Aglaothamnion neglectum). This is because the electron density of the gamma-polypeptide is mostly averaged out by its threefold crystallographic symmetry and only a few amino acids can be modeled.

For (αβγ)_{6}, (αβ)_{6} or (αβγ)_{3}(αβ)_{3} the values from the table should be simply multiplied by 3, (αβ)_{3} contain intermediate numbers of non-protein molecules. (this non sequitur needs to be corrected)

In phycoerythrin PE545 above, one α chain (-2 or -3) binds one molecule of billin, in other examples it binds two molecules. The β chain always binds to three molecules. The small γ chain binds to none.

Two molecules of N-methyl asparagine are bound to the β chain, one 5-hydroxylysine to α (-3 or -2), one Mg^{2+} to α-3 and β, one Cl^{−} to β, 1–2 molecules of SO^{2−}_{4} to α or β.

Below is sample crystal structure of R-phycoerythrin from Protein Data Bank:

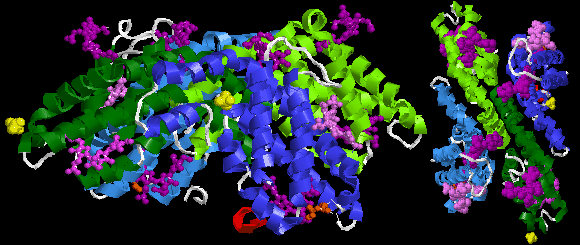
The crystal structure of R-phycoerythrin from red algae Gracilaria chilensis (PDB ID: 1EYX) - basic oligomer (αβγ)_{2} (so called asymmetric unit). It contains phycocyanobilin, biliverdine IX alpha, phycourobilin, N-methyl asparagine, SO_{4}^{2−}. One fragment of γ chain is red, second one white because it is not considered as alpha helix despite identical aminoacid sequence.

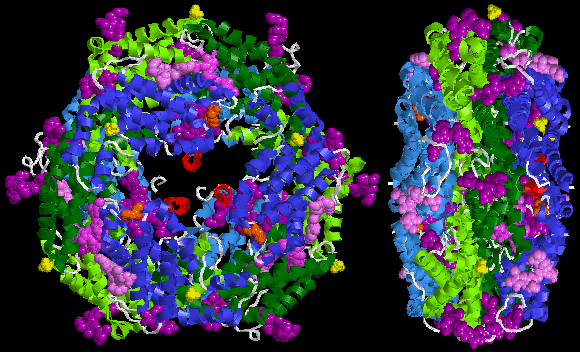
The entire oligomer of R-phycoerythrin from Gracilaria chilensis (αβγ)_{6} (PDB ID: 1EYX)

== Spectral characteristics ==
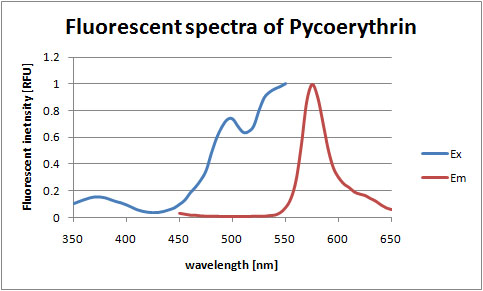
Absorption (or extinction) and fluorescent (or emission) spectra of phycoerythrin

Absorption peaks in the visible light spectrum are measured at 495 and 545/566 nm, depending on the chromophores bound and the considered organism. A strong emission peak exists at 575 ± 10 nm. (Phycoerythrin absorbs slightly blue-green/yellowish light and emits slightly orange-yellow light.)

Property	Value
Absorption maximum	565 nm
Additional Absorption peak	498 nm
Emission maximum	573 nm
Extinction Coefficient (ε)	1.96×10^{6} M^{−1} cm^{−1}
Quantum Yield (QY)	0.84
Brightness (ε × QY)	1.65×10^{6} M^{−1} cm^{−1}

PEB and DBV bilins in PE545 absorb in the green spectral region too, with maxima at 545 and 569 nm respectively. The fluorescence emission maximum is at 580 nm.

== R-Phycoerythrin variations ==
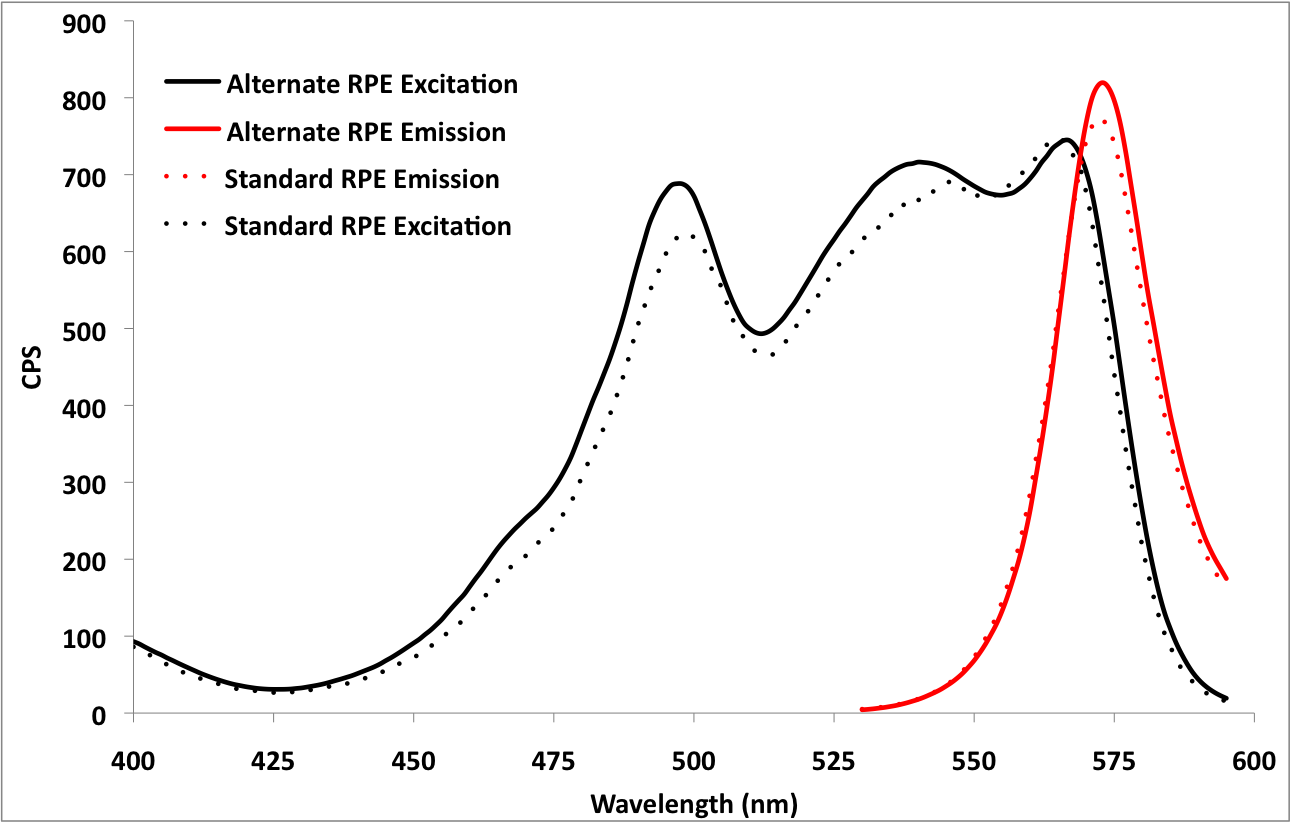
Excitation and emission profiles for R-Phycoerythrin from two different algae. Common laser excitation wavelengths are also noted.

As mentioned above, phycoerythrin can be found in a variety of algal species. As such, there can be variation in the efficiency of absorbance and emission of light required for facilitation of photosynthesis. This could be a result of the depth in the water column that a specific alga typically resides and a consequent need for greater or less efficiency of the accessory pigments.

With advances in imaging and detection technology which can avoid rapid photobleaching, protein fluorophores have become a viable and powerful tool for researchers in fields such as microscopy, microarray analysis and Western blotting. In light of this, it may be beneficial for researchers to screen these variable R-phycoerythrins to determine which one is most appropriate for their particular application. Even a small increase in fluorescent efficiency could reduce background noise and lower the rate of false-negative results.

== Practical applications ==
R-Phycoerythrin (also known as PE or R-PE) is useful in the laboratory as a fluorescence-based indicator for the presence of cyanobacteria and for labeling antibodies, most often for flow cytometry. Its also used in microarray assays, ELISAs, and other applications that require high sensitivity but not photostability. Its use is limited in immunofluorescence microscopy due to its rapid photobleaching characteristics. There are also other types of phycoerythrins, such as B-phycoerythrin, which have slightly different spectral properties. B-Phycoerythrin absorbs strongly at about 545 nm (slightly yellowish green) and emits strongly at 572 nm (yellow) instead and could be better suited for some instruments. B-Phycoerythrin may also be less "sticky" than R-phycoerythrin and contributes less to background signal due to nonspecific binding in certain applications. However, R-PE is much more commonly available as an antibody conjugate. Phycoerythrin (PE, λA max = 540–570 nm; λF max = 575–590 nm)

R-Phycoerythrin and B-phycoerythrin are among the brightest fluorescent dyes ever identified.
