= Allophycocyanin =

Light harvesting protein

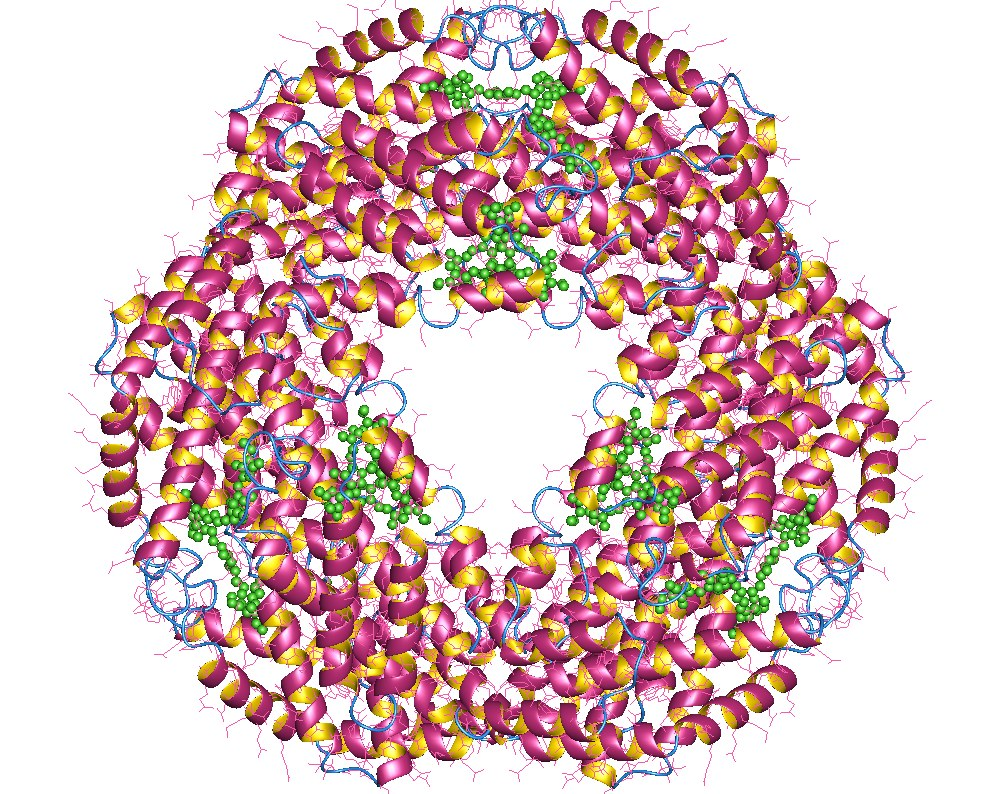
Allophycocyanin dodekamer, Gloeobacter violaceus (PDB: 2vjt)

Allophycocyanin ("other algal blue protein"; from Greek: ἄλλος (allos) meaning "other", φύκος (phykos) meaning “alga”, and κυανός (kyanos) meaning "blue") is a protein from the light-harvesting phycobiliprotein family, along with phycocyanin, phycoerythrin and phycoerythrocyanin. It is an accessory pigment to chlorophyll. All phycobiliproteins are water-soluble and therefore cannot exist within the membrane like carotenoids, but aggregate, forming clusters that adhere to the membrane called phycobilisomes. Allophycocyanin absorbs and emits red light (650 and 660 nm max, respectively), and is readily found in Cyanobacteria (also called blue-green algae), and red algae. Phycobilin pigments have fluorescent properties that are used in immunoassay kits. In flow cytometry, it is often abbreviated APC. To be effectively used in applications such as FACS, High-Throughput Screening (HTS) and microscopy, APC needs to be chemically cross-linked.

== Structural characteristics ==
Allophycocyanin can be isolated from various species of red or blue-green algae, each producing slightly different forms of the molecule. It is composed of two different subunits (α and β) in which each subunit has one phycocyanobilin (PCB) chromophore. The subunit structure for APC has been determined as (αβ)_{3}. The molecular weight of APC is 105,000 daltons.

== Spectral characteristics ==
Absorption maximum	652 nm
Additional Absorption peak	625 nm
Emission maximum	657.5 nm
Stokes Shift	5.5 nm
Extinction Coefficient	700,000 M^{−1}cm^{−1}
Quantum Yield	0.68
Brightness	1.6 × 10^{5} M^{−1}cm^{−1}

Cross-linked APC

As mentioned above, in order for APC to be useful in immunoassays it must first be chemically cross-linked to prevent it from dissociating into its component subunits when in common physiological buffers. The conventional method for accomplishing this is through a destructive process wherein the treated APC trimer is chemically disrupted in 8M urea and then allowed to re-associate through in a physiological buffer. An alternative method can be used which preserves the structural integrity of the APC trimer and allows for a brighter, more stable end-product.

== Applications ==
Many applications and instruments were developed specifically for Allophycocyanin. It is commonly used in immunoassays such as FACS, flow cytometry, and High Throughput Screening as an acceptor for Europium via Time Resolved-Fluorescence Resonance Energy Transfer (TR-FRET) assays.
