= Phycoerythrobilin =

- (3E)-phycoerythrobilin

Names
- IUPAC name (2R,3E,16R)-18-ethenyl-3-ethylidene-1,2,3,15,16,19,22,24-octahydro-2,7,13,17-tetramethyl-1,19-dioxo-21H-biline-8,12-dipropanoic Acid

Identifiers
CAS Number	18097-67-1
3D model (JSmol)	Interactive image
ChEBI	CHEBI:85659
ChemSpider	16741434
MeSH	phycoerythrobilin
PubChem CID	20057005
UNII	G4JN6A95WG
- InChI: InChI=1S/C33H38N4O6/c1-7-20-19(6)32(42)37-27(20)14-25-18(5)23(10-12-31(40)41)29(35-25)15-28-22(9-11-30(38)39)17(4)24(34-28)13-26-16(3)21(8-2)33(43)36-26/h7-8,14-15,19,26,35H,2,9-13H2,1,3-6H3,(H,36,43)(H,37,42)(H,38,39)(H,40,41)/b20-7+,27-14-,28-15-/t19-,26-/m1/s1 Key: IGJXAXFFKKRFKU-NDGVYKEISA-N
- SMILES: C=CC1=C(C)[C@@H](CC2=N/C(=C\c3[nH]c(/C=C4\NC(=O)[C@H](C)\C4=C/C)c(C)c3CCC(=O)O)C(CCC(=O)O)=C2C)NC1=O

Properties
Chemical formula	C_{33}H_{38}N_{4}O_{6}
Molar mass	586.689 g·mol^{−1}
- Except where otherwise noted, data are given for materials in their standard state (at 25 °C [77 °F], 100 kPa). Infobox references

Phycoerythrobilin is a red phycobilin, i.e. an open tetrapyrrole chromophore found in cyanobacteria and in the chloroplasts of red algae, glaucophytes and some cryptomonads. Phycoerythrobilin is present in the phycobiliprotein phycoerythrin, of which it is the terminal acceptor of energy. The amount of phycoerythrobilin in phycoerythrins varies, depending on the organism. In some Rhodophytes and oceanic cyanobacteria, phycoerythrobilin is also present in the phycocyanin, then termed R-phycocyanin. Like all phycobilins, phycoerythrobilin is covalently linked to these phycobiliproteins by a thioether bond.

== Chemical structure ==
Phycoerythrobilin is a tetrapyrrole formed in nature by the catabolism of heme B via biliverdin. Two geometric isomers of the compound have been reported, which differ only in the configuration of one sidechain. The stereochemistry of the compounds were confirmed by total synthesis of their methyl esters.

== Biosynthesis ==
(E) and (Z)-phycoerythrobilin are products of porphyrin biosynthesis beyond heme B. They arise from its oxidation which cleaves the macrocyclic ring, giving biliverdin:

heme B
biliverdin

Biliverdin is then reduced to give either the (E) or (Z) isomers of phycoerythrobilin, for example by phycoerythrobilin synthase:

biliverdin
(3E) isomer
or
(3Z) isomer

There is evidence that in some organisms it is the (3Z) form that is produced first and that this is converted into the (3E) isomer.

== Biological role ==
Phycoerythrobilins are components of phycobilisome protein complexes, the light-harvesting antennae that transmit the energy of photons to photosystem II and photosystem I in cyanobacteria and in the chloroplasts of red algae and glaucophytes. The absorption spectrum of phycoerythrobilins in the 500–650 nm range where chlorophyll absorbs poorly allows organisms such as Galdieria sulphuraria which use them to be more efficient.

The tetrapyrrole is covalently attached to the phycobiliprotein through a bond between the sulfur of a cysteine amino-acid and the (3E) or (3Z) ring-C=CCH_{3} sidechain, as a thioether.

== Uses ==
Phycoerythrobilins, in the form of phycobiliproteins, are widely used in foodstuffs and cosmetics as colourants. They are mainly obtained from Spirulina species.
