= Phycocyanin =

Protein complexes in algae

Phycobilisome protein
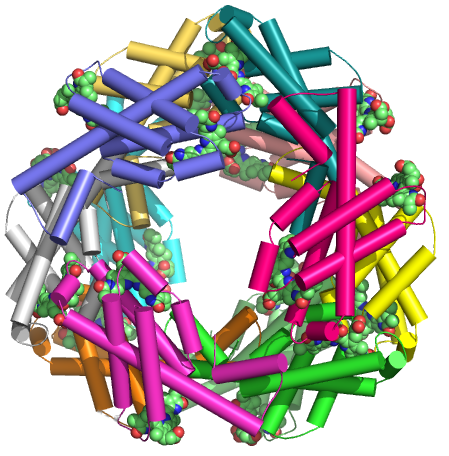
- Allophycocyanin 12-mer PDB 1all

Identifiers
- Symbol: Phycobilisome
- Pfam: PF00502
- InterPro: IPR001659
- SCOP2: 1cpc / SCOPe / SUPFAM
Available protein structures:
- PDB: IPR001659 PF00502 (ECOD; PDBsum)
- AlphaFold: IPR001659; PF00502

Phycocyanobilin

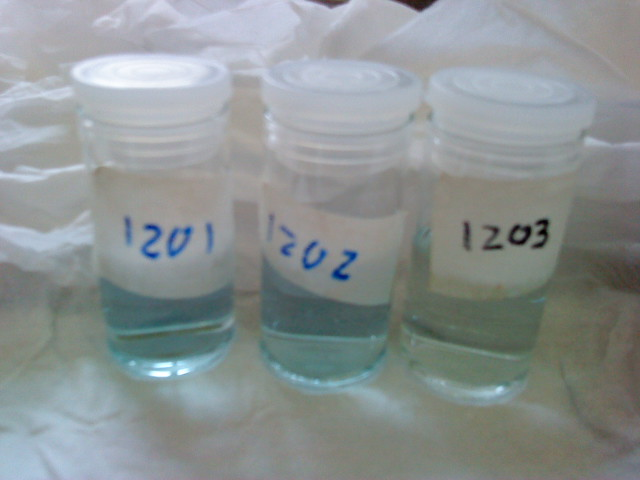
Phycocyanin pigment extracted from Microcystis aeruginosa cyanobacteria

Phycocyanin is a pigment-protein complex from the light-harvesting phycobiliprotein family, along with allophycocyanin and phycoerythrin. It is an accessory pigment to chlorophyll, found in cyanobacteria (also called blue-green algae). Because all phycobiliproteins are water-soluble, they cannot exist within the phospholipid cell membranes like carotenoids can. Instead, phycobiliproteins aggregate to form clusters that adhere to the membrane, called phycobilisomes.

The term "phycocyanin" come from the Greek phyco meaning "algae" and cyanin is from the English word "cyan", which conventionally means a shade of blue-green (close to aqua) and is also derived from the Greek "kyanos", which means a somewhat different color of dark color. Phycocyanin has a characteristic light blue color, absorbing orange and red light, particularly the 620 nm wavelength (depending on which specific type it is), and emits fluorescence at about 650 nm (also depending on which type it is). The related allophycocyanin absorbs and emits at longer wavelengths than phycocyanin C or phycocyanin R.

C-phycocyanin is often found in cyanobacteria that thrive around hot springs, as it can be stable up to around 70 °C (158 °F), with identical spectroscopic (light absorbing) behaviours at 20 °C (68 °F) and 70 °C. Thermophiles contain slightly different amino acid sequences making it stable under these higher conditions. The phycobiliproteins are made of two subunits (alpha and beta) having a protein backbone to which 1–2 linear tetrapyrrole chromophores are covalently bound, with a molecular weight around 30,000 Da. Stability of this protein in vitro at these temperatures has been shown to be substantially lower. Photo-spectral analysis of the protein after 1 min exposure to 65 °C conditions in a purified state demonstrated a 50% loss of tertiary structure.

Phycobiliproteins have fluorescent properties that are used in immunoassay kits. The phycocyanin produced by Aphanizomenon flos-aquae and Spirulina, for example, is used in the food and beverage industry as the natural coloring agent 'Lina Blue' or 'EXBERRY Shade Blue' and is found in sweets and ice cream. In addition, fluorescence detection of phycocyanin pigments in water samples is a useful method to monitor cyanobacteria biomass.

== Structure ==
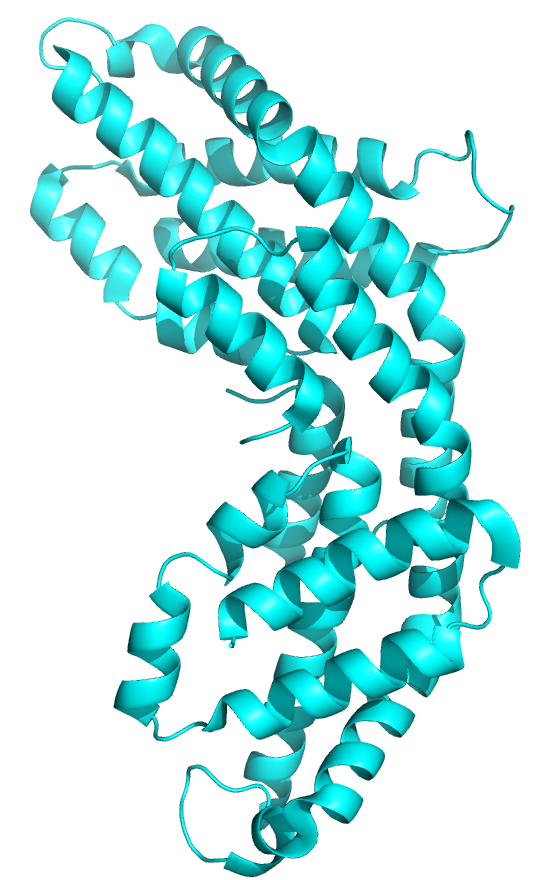
Phycocyanin (αβ) monomer

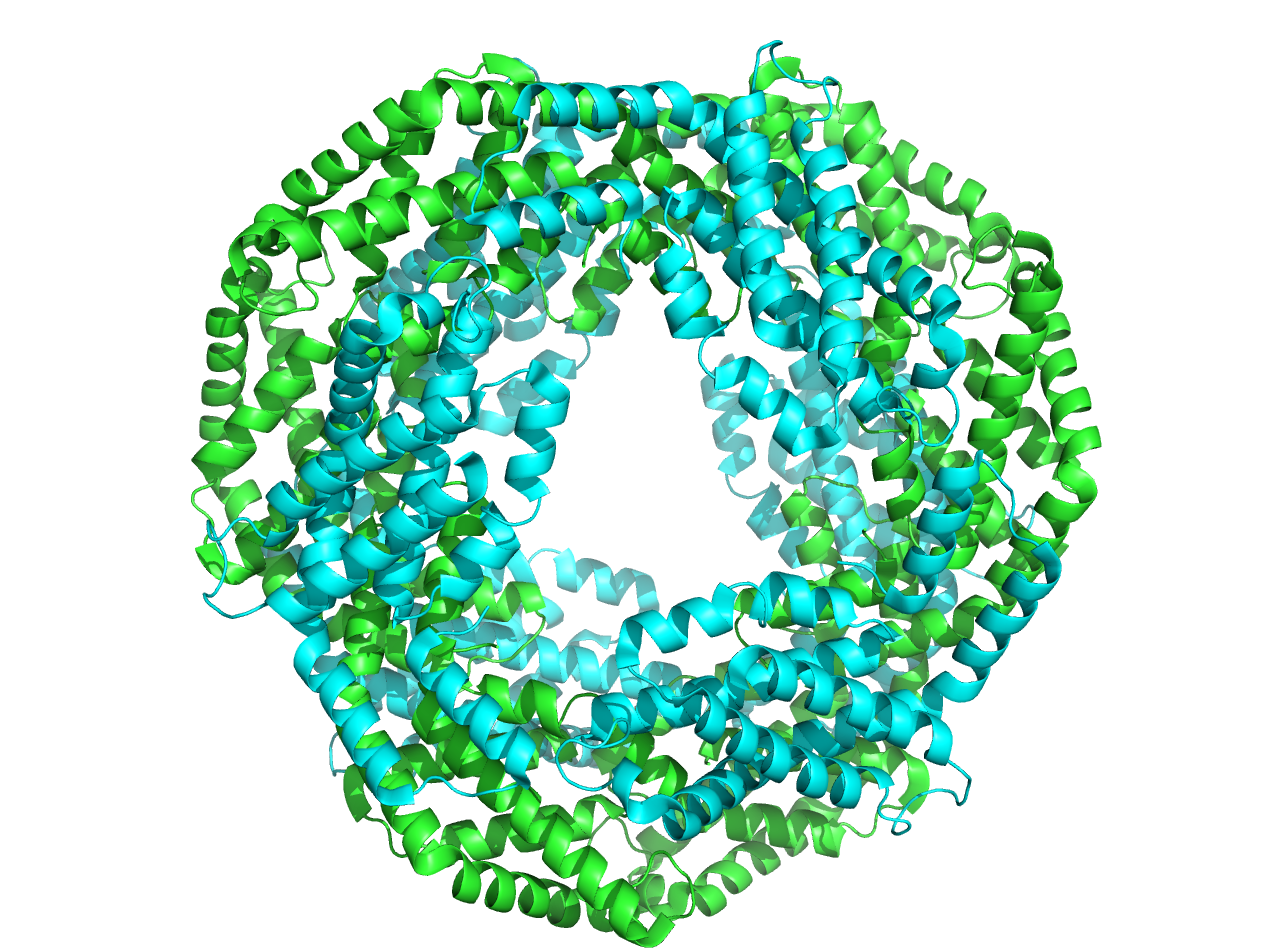
Phycocyanin (αβ)_{6} hexamer

Phycocyanin shares a common structural theme with all phycobiliproteins. The structure begins with the assembly of phycobiliprotein monomers, which are heterodimers composed of α and β subunits, and their respective chromophores linked via thioether bond.

Each subunit is typically composed of eight α-helices. Monomers spontaneously aggregate to form ring-shaped trimers (αβ)_{3}, which have rotational symmetry and a central channel. Trimers aggregate in pairs to form hexamers (αβ)_{6}, sometimes assisted with additional linker proteins. Each phycobilisome rod generally has two or more phycocyanin hexamers. Despite the overall similarity in structure and assembly of phycobiliproteins, there is a large diversity in hexamer and rod conformations, even when only considering phycocyanins. On a larger scale phycocyanins also vary in crystal structure, although the biological relevance of this is debatable.

As an example, the structure of C-phycocyanin from Synechococcus vulcanus has been refined to 1.6 Angstrom resolution. The (αβ) monomer consists of 332 amino acids and 3 thio-linked phycocyanobilin (PCB) cofactor molecules. Both the α- and β-subunits have a PCB at amino acid 84, but the β-subunit has an additional PCB at position 155 as well. This additional PCB faces the exterior of the trimeric ring and is therefore implicated in inter-rod energy transfer in the phycobilisome complex. In addition to cofactors, there are many predictable non-covalent interactions with the surrounding solvent (water) that are hypothesized to contribute to structural stability.

R-phycocyanin II (R-PC II) is found in some Synechococcus species. R-PC II is said to be the first PEB containing phycocyanin that originates in cyanobacteria. Its purified protein is composed of alpha and beta subunits in equal quantities. R-PC II has PCB at beta-84 and the phycoerythrobillin (PEB) at alpha-84 and beta-155.

As of March 21, 2023, there are 310 crystal structures of phycocyanin deposited in the Protein Data Bank.

== Spectral characteristics ==
C-phycocyanin has a single absorption peak at ~621 nm, varying slightly depending on the organism and conditions such as temperature, pH, and protein concentration in vitro. Its emission maximum is ~642 nm. This means that the pigment absorbs orange light, and emits reddish light. R-phycocyanin has an absorption maxima at 533 and 544 nm. The fluorescence emission maximum of R-phycocyanin is 646 nm.

Property	C-Phycocyanin	R-Phycocyanin
Absorption maximum (nm)	621	533, 544
Emission maximum (nm)	642	646
Extinction Coefficient (ε)	1.54 × 10^{6} M^{−1}cm^{−1}	-
Quantum Yield	0.81	-

== Ecological relevance ==
Phycocyanin is produced by many photoautotrophic cyanobacteria. Even if cyanobacteria have large concentrations of phycocyanin, productivity in the ocean is still limited due to light conditions.

Phycocyanin has ecological significance in indicating cyanobacteria bloom. Normally chlorophyll a is used to indicate cyanobacteria numbers, however since it is present in a large number of phytoplankton groups, it is not an ideal measure. For instance a study in the Baltic Sea used phycocyanin as a marker for filamentous cyanobacteria during toxic summer blooms. Some filamentous organisms in the Baltic Sea include Nodularia spumigena and Aphanizomenon flosaquae.

An important cyanobacteria named spirulina (Arthrospira platensis) is a micro algae that produces C-PC.

There are many different methods of phycocyanin production including photoautotrophic, mixotrophic and heterotrophic and recombinant production. Photoautotrophic production of phycocyanin is where cultures of cyanobacteria are grown in open ponds in either subtropical or tropical regions. Mixotrophic production of algae is where the algae are grown on cultures that have an organic carbon source like glucose. Using mixotrophic production produces higher growth rates and higher biomass compared to simply using a photoautotrophic culture. In the mixotrophic culture, the sum of heterotrophic and autotrophic growth separately was equal to the mixotrophic growth. Heterotrophic production of phycocyanin is not light limited, as per its definition. Galdieria sulphuraria is a unicellular rhodophyte that contains a large amount of C-PC and a small amount of allophycocyanin. G. sulphuraria is an example of the heterotrophic production of C-PC because its habitat is hot, acidic springs and uses a number of carbon sources for growth. Recombinant production of C-PC is another heterotrophic method and involves gene engineering.

Lichen-forming fungi and cyanobacteria often have a symbiotic relationship and thus phycocyanin markers can be used to show the ecological distribution of fungi-associated cyanobacteria. As shown in the highly specific association between Lichina species and Rivularia strains, phycocyanin has enough phylogenetic resolution to resolve the evolutionary history of the group across the northwestern Atlantic Ocean coastal margin.

== Biosynthesis ==
The two genes cpcA and cpcB, located in the cpc operon and translated from the same mRNA transcript, encode for the C-PC α- and β-chains respectively. Additional elements such as linker proteins, and enzymes involved in phycobilin synthesis and the phycobiliproteins are often encoded by genes in adjacent gene clusters, and the cpc operon of Arthrospira platensis also encodes a linker protein assisting in the assembly of C-PC complexes. In red algae, the phycobiliprotein and linker protein genes are located on the plastid genome.

Phycocyanobilin is synthesized from heme and inserted into the C-PC apo-protein by three enzymatic steps. Cyclic heme is oxidised to linear biliverdin IXα by heme oxygenase and further converted to 3Z-phycocyanobilin, the dominant phycocyanobilin isomer, by 3Z-phycocyanobilin:ferredoxin oxidoreductase. Insertion of 3Z-phycocyanobilin into the C-PC apo-protein via thioether bond formation is catalysed by phycocyanobilin lyase.

The promoter for the cpc operon is located within the 427-bp upstream region of the cpcB gene. In A. platensis, six putative promoter sequences have been identified in the region, with four of them showing expression of green fluorescent protein when transformed into E. coli. The presence of other positive elements such as light-response elements in the same region have also been demonstrated.

The multiple promoter and response element sequences in the cpc operon enable cyanobacteria and red algae to adjust its expression in response to multiple environmental conditions. Expression of the cpcA and cpcB genes is regulated by light. Low light intensities stimulate synthesis of CPC and other pigments, while pigment synthesis is repressed at high light intensities. Temperature has also been shown to affect synthesis, with specific pigment concentrations showing a clear maximum at 36 °C in Arthronema africanum, a cyanobacterium with particular high C-PC and APC contents.

Nitrogen and also iron limitation induce phycobiliprotein degradation. Organic carbon sources stimulate C-PC synthesis in Anabaena spp., but seem to have almost no effector negative effect in A. platensis. In the rhodophytes Cyanidium caldarium and Galdieria sulphuraria, C-PC production is repressed by glucose but stimulated by heme.

== Biotechnology ==
Pure phycocyanin extractions can be isolated from algae. The basic segregation order is as follows. The rupturing of the cell wall, with mechanical forces (freeze thawing) or chemical agents (enzymes). Then, C-PC is isolated with centrifugation and purified with ammonium sulfate precipitation or chromatography -either ion or gel-filtration. After, the sample gets frozen and dried.

=== Applications ===
Phycocyanin can be used in many practices, it is particularly used medicine and foods applications. It can also be used in genetics, where it acts a tracer due to its natural fluorescence.

=== Medicine ===
==== Anti-oxidation and anti-inflammation ====
Phycocyanin has both anti-oxidant and anti-inflammation properties. Peroxyl, hydroxyl, and alkoxyl radicals are all oxidants scavenged by C-PC. C-PC, however, has a greater effect on peroxyl radicals. C-PC is a metal binding antioxidant as it prevents lipid peroxidation from occurring. The peroxyl radicals are stabilized by the chromophore (a subunit of C-PC). For hydroxyl radicals to be scavenged, it must be done in low light and with high C-PC levels. Hydroxyl radicals are found at inflamed parts of the body. C-PC, being an anti-oxidant, scavenges these damage-inducing radicals, hence being an anti-inflammation agent.

==== Neuroprotection ====
Excess oxygen in the brain generates Reactive Oxygen Species (ROS). ROS cause damage to brain neurons, leading to decreased neurological function. C-phycocyanin scavenges hydrogen peroxide, a type of ROS species, from the inside of astrocyte, reducing oxidative stress. Astrocytes also increase the production of growth factors like BDNF and NDF, therefore, enhance nerve regeneration. C-PC also prevents astrogliosis and glial inflammation.

==== Hepatoprotection ====
C-phycocyanin is found to have hepatotoxicity protection. Vadiraja et al. (1998) found an increase in the serum glutamic pyruvic transaminase (SGPT) when C-PC is treated against heptatoxins such as Carbon tetrachloride (CCl4) or R-(+)-pulegone. C-PC protects the liver by the means of the Cytochrome-P450 system. It can either disturb the production of menthofuran or disturb formation of α, β-unsaturated- γ-ketoaldehyde. Both of which are key components of the cytochrome P-450 system that produced a reactive metabolite that produce toxins when it binds to liver tissues. Another possible protection mechanism by C-PC can be the scavenging of reactive metabolites (or free radicals if the cause is CCl4).

==== Anti-cancer ====
C-phycocyanin (C-PC) has anti-cancer effects. Cancer happens when cells continue to grow uncontrollably. C-PC has been found to prevent cell growth. C-PC stops the formation of tumour before the S phase. DNA synthesis is not performed due to the tumour cell entering G0, resulting in no tumour proliferation. Furthermore, C-PC induces apoptosis. When cells are treated with C-PC, ROS (Radical Oxygen Species) are made. These molecules decrease BCl-2 (regulator of apoptosis) production. Here, BCl-2 inhibits proteins called caspases. Caspases are part of the apoptosis pathway. When BCl-2 decreases, the expression of caspases increases. As a result, apoptosis occurs. C-PC alone is not enough to treat cancer, it needs to work other drugs to overcome the persistence nature of tumour cells.

=== Food ===
C-phycocyanin (C-PC) can be used as a natural blue food colouring. This food colourant can only be used for low temperature prepared goods because of its inability to maintaining its blue colouring in high heats unless there is an addition of preservatives or sugars. The type of sugar does not make a significant difference, C-PC is stable when there is high sugar content. Knowing so, C-PC can be used for numerous types of foods, one of which being syrups. C-PC can be used for syrups ranging from green to blue colours. It can have different green tints by adding yellow food colourings.
