= Phycobiliprotein =

Phycobiliproteins are water-soluble proteins present in cyanobacteria and certain algae (rhodophytes, cryptomonads, glaucocystophytes). They capture light energy, which is then passed on to chlorophylls during photosynthesis. Phycobiliproteins are formed of a complex between proteins and covalently bound phycobilins that act as chromophores (the light-capturing part). They are most important constituents of the phycobilisomes.

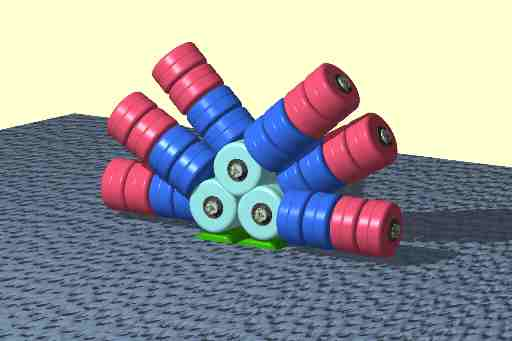
Phycobilisome structure

== Major phycobiliproteins ==
Phycobiliprotein	MW (kDa)	Ex (nm) / Em (nm)	Quantum yield	Molar extinction coefficient (M^{−1} cm^{−1})	Comment	Image
R-Phycoerythrin (R-PE)	240	498.546.566 nm / 576 nm	0.84	1.53 10^{6}	Can be excited by Kr/Ar laser Applications for R-phycoerythrin Many applications and instruments were developed specifically for R-phycoerythrin. It is commonly used in immunoassays such as FACS, flow cytometry, multimer/tetramer applications. === Structural characteristics === R-Phycoerythrin is also produced by certain red algae. The protein is made up of at least three different subunits and varies according to the species of algae that produces it. The subunit structure of the most common R-PE is (αβ)_{6}γ. The α subunit has two phycoerythrobilins (PEB), the β subunit has 2 or 3 PEBs and one phycourobilin (PUB), while the different gamma subunits are reported to have 3 PEB and 2 PUB (γ_{1}) or 1 or 2 PEB and 1 PUB (γ_{2}). (Phycobiliprotein overview information)	The crystal structure of R-phycoerythrin from red algae Gracilaria chilensis (PDB ID: 1EYX) - basic oligomer (αβγ)_{2} (so called asymmetric unit). It contains phycocyanobilin, biliverdine IX alpha, phycourobilin, N-methyl asparagine, SO^{2−}_{4}. One fragment of γ chain is red, second one white because it is not considered as alpha helix despite identical aminoacid sequence.
B-Phycoerythrin (B-PE)	240	546.566 nm / 576 nm	0,98	(545 nm) 2.4 10^{6} (563 nm) 2.33 10^{6}	Applications for B-phycoerythrin Because of its high quantum yield, B-PE is considered the world's brightest fluorophore. It is compatible with commonly available lasers and gives exceptional results in flow cytometry, Luminex and immunofluorescent staining. B-PE is also less "sticky" than common synthetic fluorophores and therefore gives less background interference. === Structural characteristics === B-Phycoerythrin (B-PE) is produced by certain red algae such as Rhodella sp. The specific spectral characteristics are a result of the composition of its subunits. B-PE is composed of at least three subunits and sometimes more. The chromophore distribution is as follows: α subunit with 2 phycoerythrobilins (PEB), β subunit with 3 PEB, and the γ subunit with 2 PEB and 2 phycourobilins (PUB). The quaternary structure is reported as (αβ)_{6}γ. (Phycobiliprotein overview information)	
C-Phycocyanin (CPC)	232	620 nm / 642 nm	0,81	1.54 10^{6}	Accepts the fluorescence for R-PE; Its red fluorescence can be transmitted to Allophycocyanin	
Allophycocyanin (APC)	105	651 nm / 662 nm	0,68	7.3 10^{5}	Excited by He/Ne laser; double labeling with Sulfo-Rhodamine 101 or any other equivalent fluorochrome. Applications for Allophycocyanin Many applications and instruments were developed specifically for allophycocyanin. It is commonly used in immunoassays such as flow cytometry and high-throughput screening. It is also a common acceptor dye for FRET assays. Structural Characteristics Allophycocyanin can be isolated from various species of red or blue-green algae, each producing slightly different forms of the molecule. It is composed of two different subunits (α and β) in which each subunit has one phycocyanobilin (PCB) chromophore. The subunit structure for APC has been determined as (αβ)_{3}. (Phycobiliprotein overview information)	Allophycocyanin dodekamer + 12 phycocyanobilin (green), Gloeobacter violaceus
↑ = FluoProbes PhycoBiliProteins data

== Characteristics ==
Phycobiliproteins demonstrate superior fluorescent properties compared to small organic fluorophores, especially when high sensitivity or multicolor detection required :

- Broad and high absorption of light suits many light sources
- Very intense emission of light: 10-20 times brighter than small organic fluorophores
- Relative large Stokes shift gives low background, and allows multicolor detections.
- Excitation and emission spectra do not overlap compared to conventional organic dyes.
- Can be used in tandem (simultaneous use by FRET) with conventional chromophores (i.e. PE and FITC, or APC and SR101 with the same light source).
- Longer fluorescence retention period.
- High water solubility

== Applications ==
Phycobiliproteins allow very high detection sensitivity, and can be used in various fluorescence based techniques fluorimetric microplate assays, FISH and multicolor detection.

They are under development for use in artificial photosynthesis, limited by the relatively low conversion efficiency of 4-5%.
