= Tetrapyrrole =

Class of chemical compounds

Tetrapyrroles are a class of chemical compounds that contain four pyrrole or pyrrole-like rings. The pyrrole units are linked by =CH− or −CH_{2}− bridges, in either a linear or a cyclic fashion. Pyrroles are a five-atom ring with four carbon atoms and one nitrogen atom. Tetrapyrroles are common cofactors in biochemistry, and their biosynthesis and degradation feature prominently in the chemistry of life.

Some tetrapyrroles have roles in living systems, such as hemoglobin and chlorophyll. In these two species, and others, the pyrrole macrocycle ring frames a metal atom, which forms a coordination compound with the pyrroles and plays a central role in the biochemical function of those molecules.

Tetrapyrroles typically act as chromophores because of their high degree of conjugation. As a result, compounds containing them are commonly colored.

== Structure ==
Linear tetrapyrroles (called bilanes) include:

- Heme breakdown products (e.g., bilirubin, biliverdin)
- Phycobilins, found in cyanobacteria)
- Luciferins, found in dinoflagellates and euphausiid shrimps (krill)
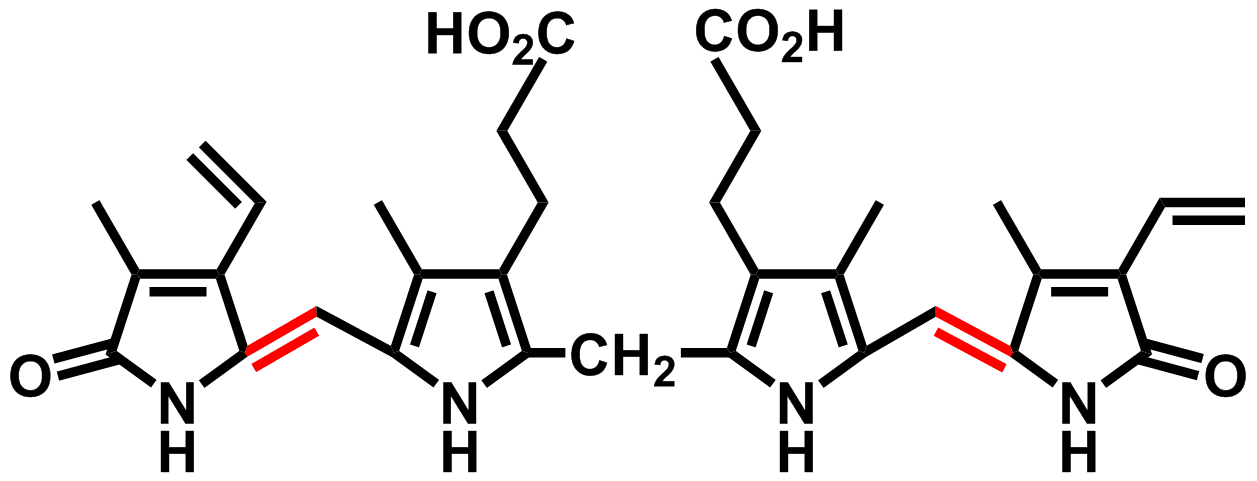
Bilirubin

Biliverdin

Phycoerythrobilin

Luciferin in dinoflagellates (R is H) and in krill (R is OH)

Cyclic tetrapyrroles having four one-carbon bridges include:

- Porphin, the simplest tetrapyrrole
- Porphyrins, including heme, the core of hemoglobin
- Chlorins, including those at the core of chlorophyll.
Porphin

Uroporphyrinogen III, a cyclic tetrapyrrole and precursor in biosynthesis of many porphyrins

Heme group of hemoglobin, which has a porphin macrocycle.

The chlorin section of the chlorophyll a molecule. The green box shows a group that varies between chlorophyll types.

Cyclic tetrapyrroles having three one-carbon bridges and one direct bond between the pyrroles include:

- Corrins, including the cores of cobalamins, when complexed with a cobalt ion.
Cobalamin structure includes a corrin macrocycle.
