= Hsue-Chu Tsien =

Chinese-born American aeronautical and mechanical engineer

Hsue-Chu Tsien, COL (H.C. Tsien, 17 January 1915 – 21 March 1997; simplified Chinese: 钱学榘; traditional Chinese: 錢學榘; pinyin: Qián Xuéjù), was a Chinese-born American aeronautical and mechanical engineer who played important roles in aircraft building in both China and afterward the United States.

== Biography ==
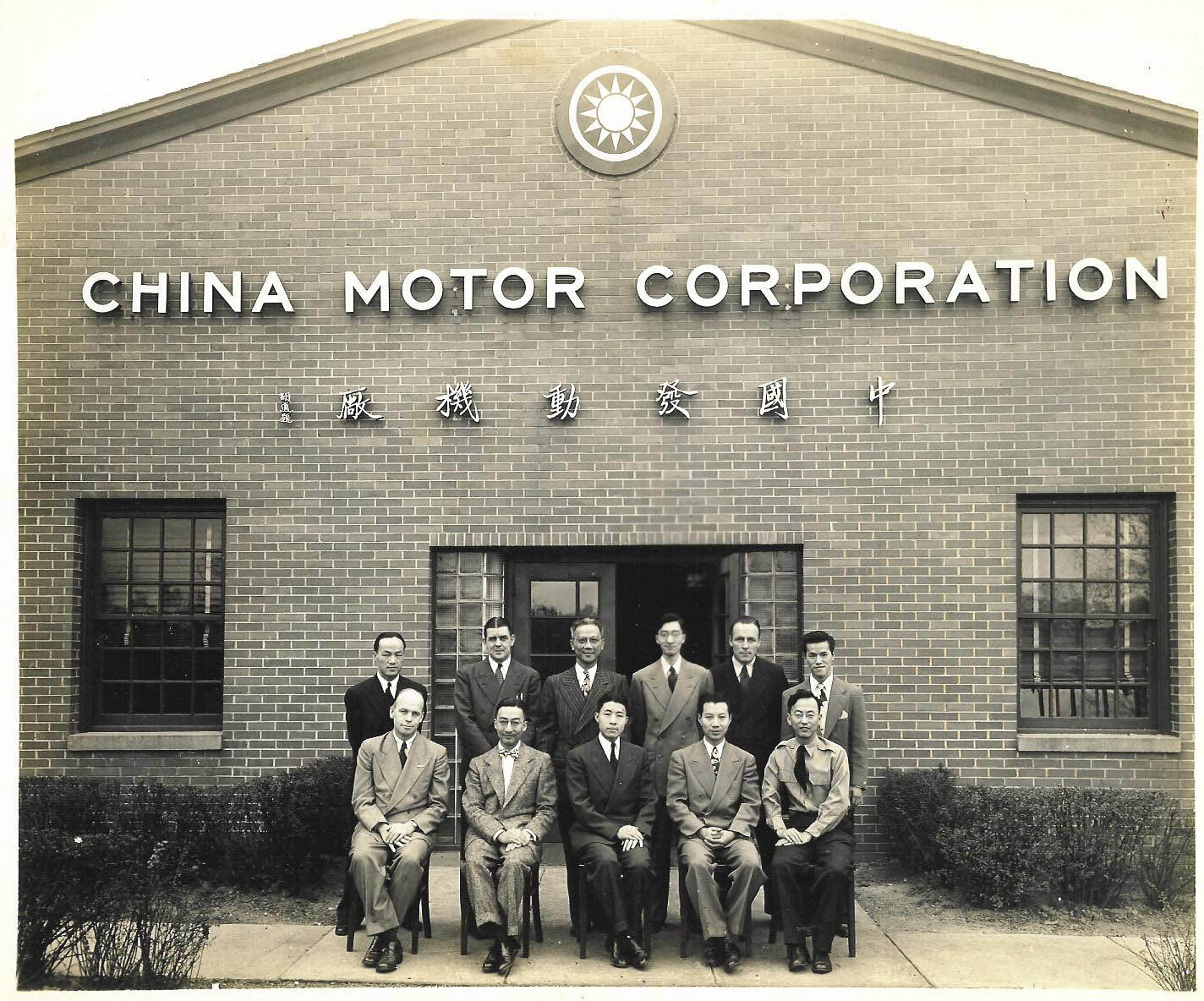
H.C. Tsien (sitting row right) was in front of the China Motor Corporation together with his Chinese and American colleagues. Only Tsien was in military uniform. Tung Hua Lin was in the center of the sitting row. China Motor Corp (different from the current China Motor Corporation in Taipei, Taiwan) was established during the World War II with American support, and it was the first Chinese factory of manufacturing jet engines. The Chinese title of the factory (中國發動機厰) was written (calligraphy) by the famous Chinese scholar Hu Shih.

Tsien was born in 1915 in Hangzhou, Republic of China. Tsien was a 33rd-generation descendant of Qian Liu, King of Wuyue. Specifically, his line was descended from King Qian Hongzong. Tsien studied at Zhejiang Anding School (浙江安定學堂; now Hangzhou No.7 High School) and Hangzhou High School.

Tsien was admitted to the National Chekiang University (current Zhejiang University) in Hangzhou. In 1931 August, Tsien chose the National Chiao Tung University in Shanghai, and enrolled at the School of Mechanics. Tsien completed his internship at the National Central Aviation Academy (國立中央航空學校) at the Jianqiao Airfield in suburban Hangzhou.

Tsien graduated the top of 161 from the school of mechanics. Soon after graduation Tsien went to Beiping (now Beijing) and became a teaching assistant at Tsinghua University where he taught undergraduate courses for one year.

In August 1935, Tsien won a Boxer Indemnity Scholarship. He went to study mechanics and aeronautics in the United States. In 1937, Tsien obtained his master's degree in aeronautical engineering from the Massachusetts Institute of Technology. In the same year, the Second Sino-Japanese War broke out, Tsien continued staying in the United States and was in charge of importing plants for the Central Machinery Factory (中央機器厰) of the National Resources Commission for the war-time China. Based on the Allies' agreement, those plants were used to support the battlefront of the war.

In 1938, Tsien went to work in Switzerland and returned in 1939. Tsien was appointed the deputy chief-engineer (the Chief Engineer was Y. T. Li) of the aircraft engine factory of the National Air Aviation Commission (國家航空委員會), which was the most important aircraft manufacturer of the Republic of China during World War II. Because of the invasion of Japanese army, the factory was relocated in Dading, Guizhou Province, the rear area and one of the logistic centers of China during the war.

In 1943, Tsien was sent to India, and was responsible for organizing and importing necessary supplies into west China through India, to support the war. Because the east coastline and northeast China were already occupied by Japanese army, and the Indochina route was the only open way that Allies can deliver supplies to China. Tsien also participated in the design and manufacture of vehicles and aircraft for battle and transport uses. Tsien was ranked Colonel of the Republic of China Air Force. Tsien made contributions for Allies to the victory of the World War II East Asian battlefield.

After the end of the Second World War, Tsien and his family settled in the United States. Due to the atmosphere of the following Cold War and China's extreme turmoil, Tsien naturalized as an American citizen after 1949. Tsien worked in RCA Vacuum Tube Division and then Esso Research and Engineering.

In 1997, Tsien succumbed to cancer in California at age 82.

== Legend of Tsien's family ==
=== H.C. and H.S. Tsien ===
Tsien's cousin, the famous aerospace scientist and engineer Tsien Hsue-shen (H.S.), also played important roles both in the United States and China (however, quite opposite to Hsue-Chu Tsien's first-ROC-then-USA, H.S. first served the United States and later the PRC). H.S. was a co-founding father of the Caltech Jet Propulsion Laboratory (later acquired by NASA). The two cousins had totally different destinies. After 1949, Hsue-Chu Tsien decided to stay and work in the United States; however H.S., widely regarded as a victim of the McCarthyism during the 1950s, was deported to the communist China in 1956. H.S. became the prominent leader of China's rocket and missile programs. In 1979, H.S. was awarded the prestigious Distinguished Alumni Award of Caltech, which he received in 2001. H.S., a senior academician of both the Chinese Academy of Sciences and Chinese Academy of Engineering, died in Beijing on October 31, 2009, at age 97.

Hsue-Chu Tsien and H.S. not only shared the same paternal grandfather, but also were schoolmates. They matriculated at the same university (Jiaotong University) and had the same major. H.S. was one year senior.

Both Tsiens won the Boxer Indemnity Scholarship and went to study in the United States in the 1930s, with H.S. went to USA in August 1934, and Hsue-Chu Tsien followed after one year (in August 1935). They became school mates again in the United States, both studied at MIT, but H.S. later transferred to Caltech.

During World War II, H.C. was given the military rank of Air Force Colonel by the Republic of China when he served as the Deputy Chief Engineer at the Dading Airplane Factory (大定飛機製造廠) in Dading, Guizhou Province. Approximately at the same time, H.S., the cousin of H.C., was also temporarily given the military rank as colonel, but by the United States Army Air Forces. In 1956 during the Sino-Soviet negotiation, H.S. was again temporarily granted military rank but as the Lieutenant General of the People's Liberation Army; it was nominated by Zhou Enlai and approved by Chairman Mao Zedong.

=== The science and engineering dynasty ===
Hsue-Chu Tsien married Yi-Ying Tsien (Née: Li; 李懿颖), her brothers were also MIT alumni and engineering professors at MIT. Two of Yi-Ying Tsien's brothers S. Y. Lee and Y. T. Li are members of the National Academy of Engineering. Y. T. Li's wife, T.D. Lin (林同端), is the sister of Tung-Yen Lin who was also a member of the National Academy of Engineering and received the National Medal of Science in 1986 from President Ronald Reagan. Tung-Yen Lin's cousin Tung Hua Lin was also a member of the National Academy of Engineering and received the Theodore von Karman Medal in 1988. Tung Hua Lin's son Robert Lin is a member of National Academy of Sciences.

Hsue-Chu Tsien had three sons, the oldest Richard W. Tsien is a famous neurobiologist at Stanford who's also member of both the United States National Academy of Sciences and Institute of Medicine; the youngest - Roger Y. Tsien was a cell biologist who was the 2008 Nobel Chemistry Prize Laureate.
