= Cell cycle =

Events leading to cell division

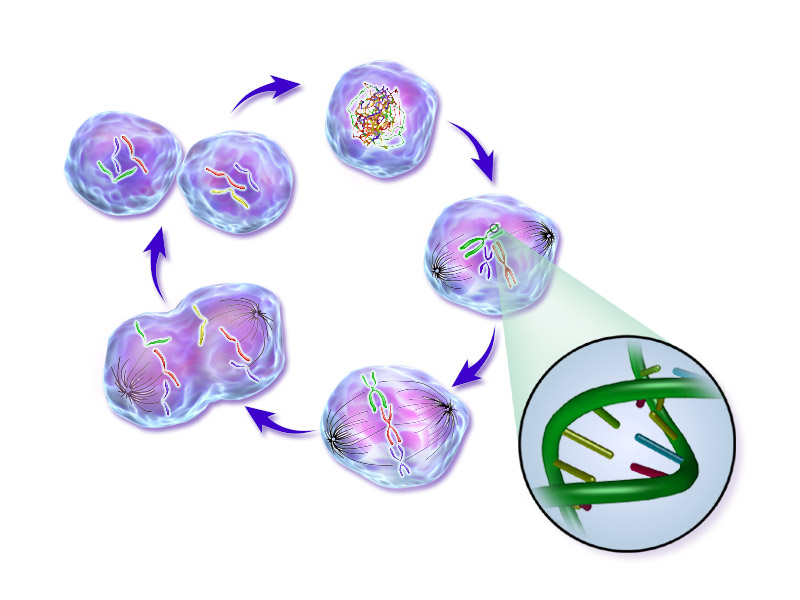
Life cycle of a normal cell in the body

Onion (Allium) cells in different phases of the cell cycle. Growth of the organism is carefully controlled by regulating the cell cycle.

Cell cycle in Deinococcus radiodurans

The cell cycle, or cell-division cycle, is the sequence of events that take place in a cell and lead to its division into two daughter cells. These events include the growth of the cell, duplication of its DNA (DNA replication) and some of its organelles, and subsequently the partitioning of its cytoplasm, chromosomes and other components into two daughter cells in a process called cell division.

In eukaryotic cells (having a cell nucleus) including animal, plant, fungal, and protist cells, the cell cycle is divided into two main stages: interphase, and the M phase that includes mitosis and cytokinesis. During interphase, the cell grows, accumulating nutrients needed for mitosis, and replicates its DNA and some of its organelles. Its successive stages differ in their specialized biochemical processes, preparing the cell for initiation of the cell's division, but are not usually morphologically distinguishable. During the M phase, the replicated chromosomes, organelles, and cytoplasm separate into two new daughter cells. To ensure the proper replication of cellular components and division, cell cycle checkpoints follow each of the key stages of the cycle, controlling whether the cell progresses to the next.

In cells without nuclei (the prokaryotes: bacteria and archaea), the cell cycle is divided into the B, C, and D periods. The B period extends from the end of cell division to the beginning of DNA replication. DNA replication occurs during the C period. The D period refers to the stage between the end of DNA replication and the splitting of the bacterial cell into two daughter cells.

In single-celled organisms, a single cell-division cycle is how the organism reproduces. In multicellular organisms such as plants and animals, a series of cell-division cycles is how the organism develops from a single-celled fertilized egg into a mature organism, and is also the process by which hair, skin, blood cells, and some internal organs are regenerated and healed (with the possible exception of nerves; see nerve damage). After cell division, each of the daughter cells begins the interphase of a new cell cycle.

== Eukaryotic phases ==
The eukaryotic cell cycle consists of four distinct phases: G_{1} phase, S phase (synthesis), G_{2} phase (collectively known as interphase) and M phase (mitosis and cytokinesis). M phase is itself composed of two tightly coupled processes: mitosis, in which the cell's nucleus divides, and cytokinesis, in which the cell's cytoplasm and cell membrane divides forming two daughter cells. Activation of each phase is dependent on the proper progression and completion of the previous one. Cells that have temporarily or reversibly stopped dividing are said to have entered a state of quiescence known as G_{0} phase or resting phase.

Schematic of the cell cycle. Outer ring: I = Interphase, M = Mitosis; inner ring: M = Mitosis, G_{1} = Gap 1, G_{2} = Gap 2, S = Synthesis; not in ring: G_{0} = Gap 0/Resting

State	Phase	Abbreviation	Description
Resting	Gap 0	G_{0}	A phase where the cell has left the cycle and has stopped dividing.
Interphase	Gap 1	G_{1}	Cell growth. The G_{1} checkpoint ensures that everything is ready for DNA synthesis.
Interphase	Synthesis	S	DNA replication.
Interphase	Gap 2	G_{2}	Growth and preparation for mitosis. The G_{2} checkpoint ensures that everything is ready to enter the M (mitosis) phase and divide.
Cell division	Mitosis	M	Cell division occurs. The Metaphase Checkpoint ensures that the cell is ready to complete cell division.

=== G_{0} phase (quiescence) ===
Plant cell cycle

Animal cell cycle

G_{0} is a resting phase where the cell has left the cycle and has stopped dividing. The cell cycle starts with this phase. Non-proliferative (non-dividing) cells in multicellular eukaryotes generally enter the quiescent G_{0} state from G_{1} and may remain quiescent for long periods of time, possibly indefinitely (as is often the case for neurons). This is very common for cells that are fully differentiated. Some cells enter the G_{0} phase semi-permanently and are considered post-mitotic, e.g., some liver, kidney, and stomach cells. Many cells do not enter G_{0} and continue to divide throughout an organism's life, e.g., epithelial cells.

The word "post-mitotic" is sometimes used to refer to both quiescent and senescent cells. Cellular senescence occurs in response to DNA damage and external stress and usually constitutes an arrest in G_{1}. Cellular senescence may make a cell's progeny nonviable; it is often a biochemical alternative to the self-destruction of such a damaged cell by apoptosis.

=== Interphase ===
Interphase represents the phase between two successive M phases. Interphase is a series of changes that takes place in a newly formed cell and its nucleus before it becomes capable of division again. It is also called preparatory phase or intermitosis. Typically interphase lasts for at least 91% of the total time required for the cell cycle.

Interphase proceeds in three stages, G_{1}, S, and G_{2}, followed by the cycle of mitosis and cytokinesis. The cell's nuclear DNA contents are duplicated during S phase.

==== G_{1} phase (First growth phase or Post mitotic gap phase) ====
Schematic karyogram of the human chromosomes, showing their usual state in the G_{0} and G_{1} phase of the cell cycle. At top center it also shows the chromosome 3 pair in metaphase (annotated as "Meta."), which takes place after having undergone DNA synthesis which occurs in the S phase (annotated as S) of the cell cycle.

The first phase within interphase, from the end of the previous M phase until the beginning of DNA synthesis, is called G_{1} (G indicating gap). It is also called the growth phase. During this phase, the biosynthetic activities of the cell, which are considerably slowed down during M phase, resume at a high rate. The duration of G_{1} is highly variable, even among different cells of the same species. In this phase, the cell increases its supply of proteins, increases the number of organelles (such as mitochondria, ribosomes), and grows in size. In G_{1} phase, a cell has three options.

- To continue cell cycle and enter S phase
- Stop cell cycle and enter G_{0} phase for undergoing differentiation.
- Become arrested in G_{1} phase hence it may enter G_{0} phase or re-enter cell cycle.

The deciding point is called check point (Restriction point). This check point is called the restriction point or START and is regulated by G_{1}/S cyclins, which cause transition from G_{1} to S phase. Passage through the G_{1} check point commits the cell to division.

==== S phase (DNA replication) ====
The ensuing S phase starts when DNA synthesis commences; when it is complete, all of the chromosomes have been replicated, i.e., each chromosome consists of two sister chromatids. Thus, during this phase, the amount of DNA in the cell has doubled, though the ploidy and number of chromosomes are unchanged. Rates of RNA transcription and protein synthesis are very low during this phase. An exception to this is histone production, most of which occurs during the S phase.

==== G_{2} phase (growth) ====
G_{2} phase occurs after DNA replication and is a period of protein synthesis and rapid cell growth to prepare the cell for mitosis. During this phase microtubules begin to reorganize to form a spindle (preprophase). Before proceeding to mitotic phase, cells must be checked at the G_{2} checkpoint for any DNA damage within the chromosomes. The G_{2} checkpoint is mainly regulated by the tumor protein p53. If the DNA is damaged, p53 will either repair the DNA or trigger the apoptosis of the cell. If p53 is dysfunctional or mutated, cells with damaged DNA may continue through the cell cycle, leading to the development of cancer.

=== Mitotic phase (chromosome separation) ===
The relatively brief M phase consists of nuclear division (karyokinesis) and division of cytoplasm (cytokinesis). M phase is complex and highly regulated. The sequence of events is divided into phases, corresponding to the completion of one set of activities and the start of the next. These phases are sequentially known as:

- prophase
- prometaphase
- metaphase
- anaphase
- telophase

A diagram of the mitotic phases

Mitosis is the process by which a eukaryotic cell separates the chromosomes in its cell nucleus into two identical sets in two nuclei. During the process of mitosis the pairs of chromosomes condense (chromosome condensation) and attach to microtubules that pull the sister chromatids to opposite sides of the cell.

Mitosis occurs exclusively in eukaryotic cells, but occurs in different ways in different species. For example, animal cells undergo an "open" mitosis, where the nuclear envelope breaks down before the chromosomes separate, while fungi such as Aspergillus nidulans and Saccharomyces cerevisiae (yeast) undergo a "closed" mitosis, where chromosomes divide within an intact cell nucleus.

=== Cytokinesis phase (separation of all cell components) ===
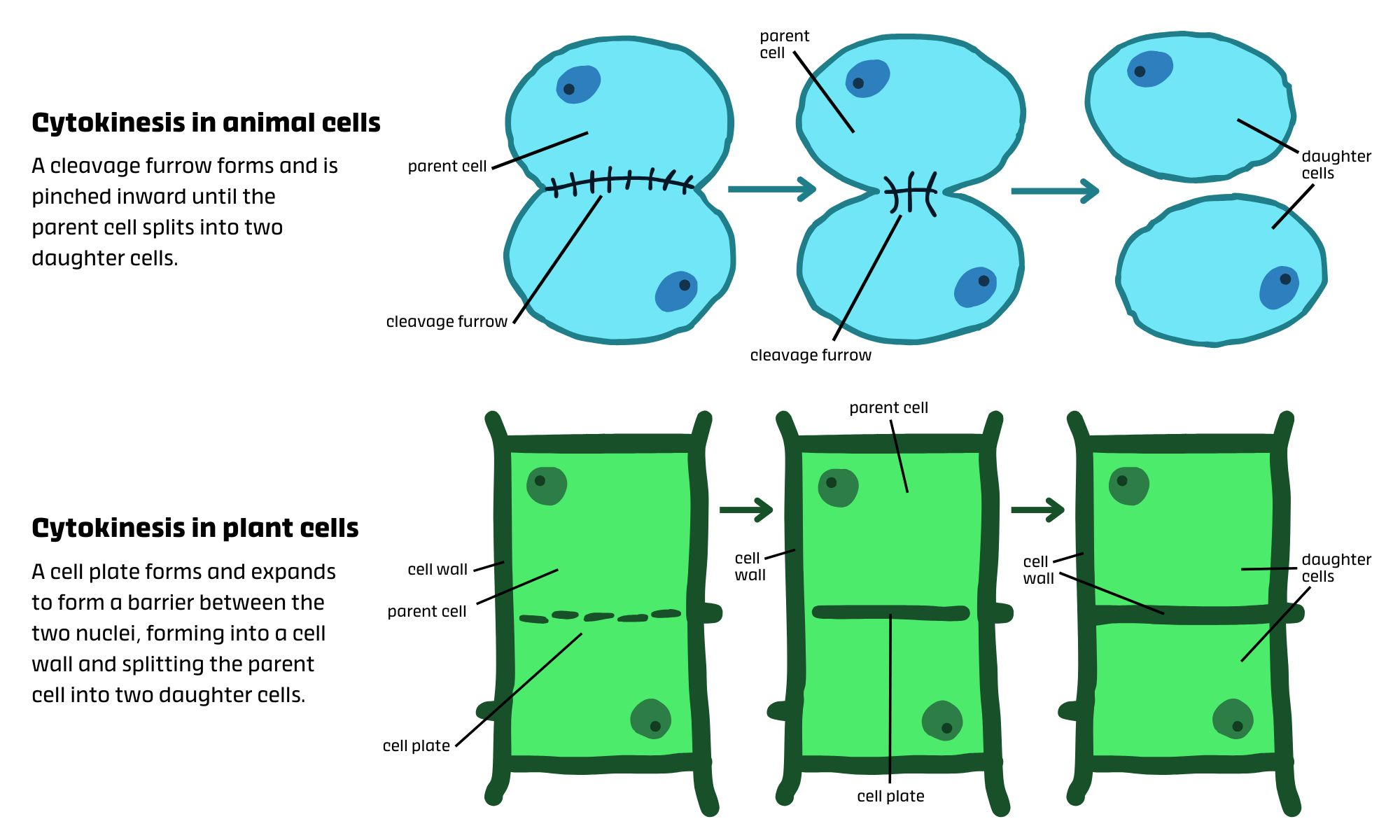
Cytokinesis in animal cells and plant cells

Mitosis is immediately followed by cytokinesis, which divides the nuclei, cytoplasm, organelles and cell membrane into two cells containing roughly equal shares of these cellular components. Cytokinesis occurs differently in plant and animal cells. While the cell membrane forms a groove that gradually deepens to separate the cytoplasm in animal cells, a cell plate is formed to separate it in plant cells. The position of the cell plate is determined by the position of a preprophase band of microtubules and actin filaments. Mitosis and cytokinesis together define the division of the parent cell into two daughter cells, genetically identical to each other and to their parent cell. This accounts for approximately 10% of the cell cycle.

Because cytokinesis usually occurs in conjunction with mitosis, "mitosis" is often used interchangeably with "M phase". However, there are many cells where mitosis and cytokinesis occur separately, forming single cells with multiple nuclei in a process called endoreplication. This occurs most notably among the fungi and slime molds, but is found in various groups. Even in animals, cytokinesis and mitosis may occur independently, for instance during certain stages of fruit fly embryonic development. Errors in mitosis can result in cell death through apoptosis or cause mutations that may lead to cancer.

== Regulation of eukaryotic cell cycle ==
Levels of the three major cyclin types oscillate during the cell cycle (top), providing the basis for oscillations in the cyclin–Cdk complexes that drive cell-cycle events (bottom). Cdk levels are constant and in large excess over cyclin levels; thus, cyclin–Cdk complexes form in parallel with cyclin levels. The enzymatic activities of cyclin–Cdk complexes also tend to rise and fall in parallel with cyclin levels. (Note: Although in some cases Cdk inhibitor proteins or phosphorylation introduce a delay between the formation and activation of cyclin–Cdk complexes) Formation of active G1/S–Cdk complexes commits the cell to a new division cycle at the Start checkpoint in late G1. G1/S–Cdks then activate the S–Cdk complexes that initiate DNA replication at the beginning of S phase. M–Cdk activation occurs after the completion of S phase, resulting in progression through the G2/M checkpoint and assembly of the mitotic spindle. APC activation then triggers sister-chromatid separation at the metaphase-to-anaphase transition. (Note: APC activity also causes the destruction of S and M cyclins and thus the inactivation of Cdks, which promotes the completion of mitosis and cytokinesis.) APC activity is maintained in G1 until G1/S–Cdk activity rises again and commits the cell to the next cycle. (Note: This scheme does not apply to all cell types.)

Regulation of the cell cycle involves processes crucial to the survival of a cell, including the detection and repair of genetic damage as well as the prevention of uncontrolled cell division. The molecular events that control the cell cycle are ordered and directional; that is, each process occurs in a sequential fashion and it is impossible to "reverse" the cycle.

=== Role of cyclins and CDKs ===
Nobel Laureate; Paul Nurse	Nobel Laureate; Tim Hunt

Two key classes of regulatory molecules, cyclins and cyclin-dependent kinases (CDKs), determine a cell's progress through the cell cycle. Leland H. Hartwell, R. Timothy Hunt, and Paul M. Nurse won the 2001 Nobel Prize in Physiology or Medicine for their discovery of these central molecules. Many of the genes encoding cyclins and CDKs are conserved among all eukaryotes, but in general, more complex organisms have more elaborate cell cycle control systems that incorporate more individual components. Many of the relevant genes were first identified by studying yeast, especially Saccharomyces cerevisiae; genetic nomenclature in yeast dubs many of these genes cdc (for "cell division cycle") followed by an identifying number, e.g. cdc25 or cdc20.

Cyclins form the regulatory subunits and CDKs the catalytic subunits of an activated heterodimer; cyclins have no catalytic activity and CDKs are inactive in the absence of a partner cyclin. When activated by a bound cyclin, CDKs perform a common biochemical reaction called phosphorylation that activates or inactivates target proteins to orchestrate coordinated entry into the next phase of the cell cycle. Different cyclin-CDK combinations determine the downstream proteins targeted. CDKs are constitutively expressed in cells whereas cyclins are synthesised at specific stages of the cell cycle, in response to various molecular signals.

==== General mechanism of cyclin-CDK interaction ====
Upon receiving a pro-mitotic extracellular signal, G_{1} cyclin-CDK complexes become active to prepare the cell for S phase, promoting the expression of transcription factors that in turn promote the expression of S cyclins and of enzymes required for DNA replication. The G_{1} cyclin-CDK complexes also promote the degradation of molecules that function as S phase inhibitors by targeting them for ubiquitination. Once a protein has been ubiquitinated, it is targeted for proteolytic degradation by the proteasome. Results from a study of E2F transcriptional dynamics at the single-cell level argue that the role of G1 cyclin-CDK activities, in particular cyclin D-CDK4/6, is to tune the timing rather than the commitment of cell cycle entry.

Active S cyclin-CDK complexes phosphorylate proteins that make up the pre-replication complexes assembled during G_{1} phase on DNA replication origins. The phosphorylation serves two purposes: to activate each already-assembled pre-replication complex, and to prevent new complexes from forming. This ensures that every portion of the cell's genome will be replicated once and only once. The reason for prevention of gaps in replication is fairly clear, because daughter cells that are missing all or part of crucial genes will die. However, for reasons related to gene copy number effects, possession of extra copies of certain genes is also deleterious to the daughter cells.

Mitotic cyclin-CDK complexes, which are synthesized but inactivated during S and G_{2} phases, promote the initiation of mitosis by stimulating downstream proteins involved in chromosome condensation and mitotic spindle assembly. A critical complex activated during this process is a ubiquitin ligase known as the anaphase-promoting complex (APC), which promotes degradation of structural proteins associated with the chromosomal kinetochore. APC also targets the mitotic cyclins for degradation, ensuring that telophase and cytokinesis can proceed.

==== Specific action of cyclin-CDK complexes ====
Cyclin D is the first cyclin produced in the cells that enter the cell cycle, in response to extracellular signals (e.g. growth factors). Cyclin D levels stay low in resting cells that are not proliferating. Additionally, CDK4/6 and CDK2 are also inactive because CDK4/6 are bound by INK4 family members (e.g., p16), limiting kinase activity. Meanwhile, CDK2 complexes are inhibited by the CIP/KIP proteins such as p21 and p27, When it is time for a cell to enter the cell cycle, which is triggered by a mitogenic stimuli, levels of cyclin D increase. In response to this trigger, cyclin D binds to existing CDK4/6, forming the active cyclin D-CDK4/6 complex. Cyclin D-CDK4/6 complexes in turn mono-phosphorylates the retinoblastoma susceptibility protein (Rb) to pRb. The un-phosphorylated Rb tumour suppressor functions in inducing cell cycle exit and maintaining G0 arrest (senescence).

In the last few decades, a model has been widely accepted whereby pRB proteins are inactivated by cyclin D-Cdk4/6-mediated phosphorylation. Rb has 14+ potential phosphorylation sites. Cyclin D-Cdk 4/6 progressively phosphorylates Rb to hyperphosphorylated state, which triggers dissociation of pRB–E2F complexes, thereby inducing G1/S cell cycle gene expression and progression into S phase.

Scientific observations from a study have shown that Rb is present in three types of isoforms: (1) un-phosphorylated Rb in G0 state; (2) mono-phosphorylated Rb, also referred to as "hypo-phosphorylated' or 'partially' phosphorylated Rb in early G1 state; and (3) inactive hyper-phosphorylated Rb in late G1 state. In early G1 cells, mono-phosphorylated Rb exists as 14 different isoforms, one of each has distinct E2F binding affinity. Rb has been found to associate with hundreds of different proteins and the idea that different mono-phosphorylated Rb isoforms have different protein partners was very appealing. A later report confirmed that mono-phosphorylation controls Rb's association with other proteins and generates functional distinct forms of Rb. All different mono-phosphorylated Rb isoforms inhibit E2F transcriptional program and are able to arrest cells in G1-phase. Different mono-phosphorylated forms of Rb have distinct transcriptional outputs that are extended beyond E2F regulation.

In general, the binding of pRb to E2F inhibits the E2F target gene expression of certain G1/S and S transition genes including E-type cyclins. The partial phosphorylation of Rb de-represses the Rb-mediated suppression of E2F target gene expression, begins the expression of cyclin E. The molecular mechanism that causes the cell switched to cyclin E activation is currently not known, but as cyclin E levels rise, the active cyclin E-CDK2 complex is formed, bringing Rb to be inactivated by hyper-phosphorylation. Hyperphosphorylated Rb is completely dissociated from E2F, enabling further expression of a wide range of E2F target genes are required for driving cells to proceed into S phase [1]. It has been identified that cyclin D-Cdk4/6 binds to a C-terminal alpha-helix region of Rb that is only distinguishable to cyclin D rather than other cyclins, cyclin E, A and B. This observation based on the structural analysis of Rb phosphorylation supports that Rb is phosphorylated in a different level through multiple Cyclin-Cdk complexes. This also makes feasible the current model of a simultaneous switch-like inactivation of all mono-phosphorylated Rb isoforms through one type of Rb hyper-phosphorylation mechanism. In addition, mutational analysis of the cyclin D- Cdk 4/6 specific Rb C-terminal helix shows that disruptions of cyclin D-Cdk 4/6 binding to Rb prevents Rb phosphorylation, arrests cells in G1, and bolsters Rb's functions in tumor suppressor. This cyclin-Cdk driven cell cycle transitional mechanism governs a cell committed to the cell cycle that allows cell proliferation. A cancerous cell growth often accompanies with deregulation of Cyclin D-Cdk 4/6 activity.

The hyperphosphorylated Rb dissociates from the E2F/DP1/Rb complex (which was bound to the E2F responsive genes, effectively "blocking" them from transcription), activating E2F. Activation of E2F results in transcription of various genes like cyclin E, cyclin A, DNA polymerase, thymidine kinase, etc. Cyclin E thus produced binds to CDK2, forming the cyclin E-CDK2 complex, which pushes the cell from G_{1} to S phase (G_{1}/S, which initiates the G_{2}/M transition). Cyclin B-cdk1 complex activation causes breakdown of nuclear envelope and initiation of prophase, and subsequently, its deactivation causes the cell to exit mitosis. A quantitative study of E2F transcriptional dynamics at the single-cell level by using engineered fluorescent reporter cells provided a quantitative framework for understanding the control logic of cell cycle entry, challenging the canonical textbook model. Genes that regulate the amplitude of E2F accumulation, such as Myc, determine the commitment in cell cycle and S phase entry. G1 cyclin-CDK activities are not the driver of cell cycle entry. Instead, they primarily tune the timing of E2F increase, thereby modulating the pace of cell cycle progression.

=== Inhibitors ===
==== Endogenous ====
Overview of signal transduction pathways involved in apoptosis, also known as "programmed cell death"

Two families of genes, the cip/kip (CDK interacting protein/Kinase inhibitory protein) family and the INK4a/ARF (Inhibitor of Kinase 4/Alternative Reading Frame) family, prevent the progression of the cell cycle. Because these genes are instrumental in prevention of tumor formation, they are known as tumor suppressors.

The cip/kip family includes the genes p21, p27 and p57. They halt the cell cycle in G_{1} phase by binding to and inactivating cyclin-CDK complexes. p21 is activated by p53 (which, in turn, is triggered by DNA damage e.g. due to radiation). p27 is activated by Transforming Growth Factor β (TGF β), a growth inhibitor.

The INK4a/ARF family includes p16^{INK4a}, which binds to CDK4 and arrests the cell cycle in G_{1} phase, and p14^{ARF} which prevents p53 degradation.

==== Synthetic ====
Synthetic inhibitors of Cdc25 could also be useful for the arrest of cell cycle and therefore be useful as antineoplastic and anticancer agents.

Many human cancers possess the hyper-activated Cdk 4/6 activities. Given the observations of cyclin D-Cdk 4/6 functions, inhibition of Cdk 4/6 should result in preventing a malignant tumor from proliferating. Consequently, scientists have tried to invent the synthetic Cdk4/6 inhibitor as Cdk4/6 has been characterized to be a therapeutic target for anti-tumor effectiveness. Three Cdk4/6 inhibitors – palbociclib, ribociclib, and abemaciclib – currently received FDA approval for clinical use to treat advanced-stage or metastatic, hormone-receptor-positive (HR-positive, HR+), HER2-negative (HER2-) breast cancer. For example, palbociclib is an orally active CDK4/6 inhibitor which has demonstrated improved outcomes for ER-positive/HER2-negative advanced breast cancer. The main side effect is neutropenia which can be managed by dose reduction.

Cdk4/6 targeted therapy will only treat cancer types where Rb is expressed. Cancer cells with loss of Rb have primary resistance to Cdk4/6 inhibitors.

=== Transcriptional regulatory network ===
Current evidence suggests that a semi-autonomous transcriptional network acts in concert with the CDK-cyclin machinery to regulate the cell cycle. Several gene expression studies in Saccharomyces cerevisiae have identified 800–1200 genes that change expression over the course of the cell cycle. They are transcribed at high levels at specific points in the cell cycle, and remain at lower levels throughout the rest of the cycle. While the set of identified genes differs between studies due to the computational methods and criteria used to identify them, each study indicates that a large portion of yeast genes are temporally regulated.

Many periodically expressed genes are driven by transcription factors that are also periodically expressed. One screen of single-gene knockouts identified 48 transcription factors (about 20% of all non-essential transcription factors) that show cell cycle progression defects. Genome-wide studies using high throughput technologies have identified the transcription factors that bind to the promoters of yeast genes, and correlating these findings with temporal expression patterns have allowed the identification of transcription factors that drive phase-specific gene expression. The expression profiles of these transcription factors are driven by the transcription factors that peak in the prior phase, and computational models have shown that a CDK-autonomous network of these transcription factors is sufficient to produce steady-state oscillations in gene expression).

Experimental evidence also suggests that gene expression can oscillate with the period seen in dividing wild-type cells independently of the CDK machinery. Orlando et al. used microarrays to measure the expression of a set of 1,271 genes that they identified as periodic in both wild type cells and cells lacking all S-phase and mitotic cyclins (clb1,2,3,4,5,6). Of the 1,271 genes assayed, 882 continued to be expressed in the cyclin-deficient cells at the same time as in the wild type cells, despite the fact that the cyclin-deficient cells arrest at the border between G_{1} and S phase. However, 833 of the genes assayed changed behavior between the wild type and mutant cells, indicating that these genes are likely directly or indirectly regulated by the CDK-cyclin machinery. Some genes that continued to be expressed on time in the mutant cells were also expressed at different levels in the mutant and wild type cells. These findings suggest that while the transcriptional network may oscillate independently of the CDK-cyclin oscillator, they are coupled in a manner that requires both to ensure the proper timing of cell cycle events. Other work indicates that phosphorylation, a post-translational modification, of cell cycle transcription factors by Cdk1 may alter the localization or activity of the transcription factors in order to tightly control timing of target genes.

While oscillatory transcription plays a key role in the progression of the yeast cell cycle, the CDK-cyclin machinery operates independently in the early embryonic cell cycle. Before the midblastula transition, zygotic transcription does not occur and all needed proteins, such as the B-type cyclins, are translated from maternally loaded mRNA.

=== DNA replication and DNA replication origin activity ===
Analyses of synchronized cultures of Saccharomyces cerevisiae under conditions that prevent DNA replication initiation without delaying cell cycle progression showed that origin licensing decreases the expression of genes with origins near their 3' ends, revealing that downstream origins can regulate the expression of upstream genes. This confirms previous predictions from mathematical modeling of a global causal coordination between DNA replication origin activity and mRNA expression, and shows that mathematical modeling of DNA microarray data can be used to correctly predict previously unknown biological modes of regulation.

== Checkpoints ==
Cell cycle checkpoints are used by the cell to monitor and regulate the progress of the cell cycle. Checkpoints prevent cell cycle progression at specific points, allowing verification of necessary phase processes and repair of DNA damage. The cell cannot proceed to the next phase until checkpoint requirements have been met. Checkpoints typically consist of a network of regulatory proteins that monitor and dictate the progression of the cell through the different stages of the cell cycle.

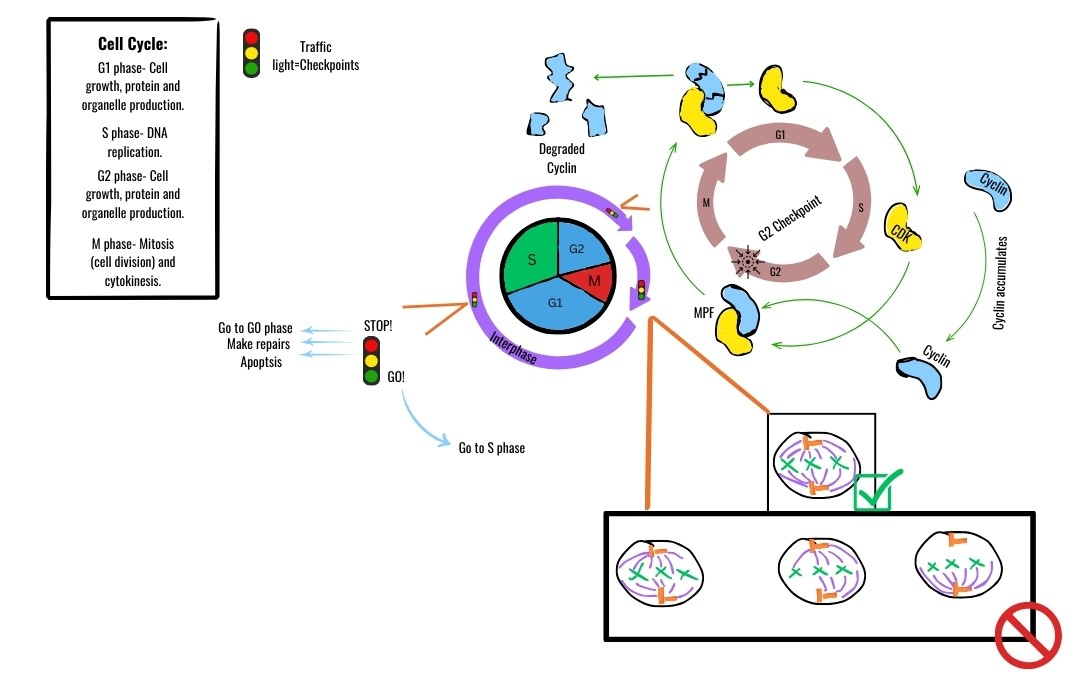
Overview of the cell cycle checkpoints, visual reference of what it does and where it happens.

It is estimated that in normal human cells about 1% of single-strand DNA damages are converted to about 50 endogenous DNA double-strand breaks per cell per cell cycle. Although such double-strand breaks are usually repaired with high fidelity, errors in their repair are considered to contribute significantly to the rate of cancer in humans.

There are several checkpoints to ensure that damaged or incomplete DNA is not passed on to daughter cells. Three main checkpoints exist: the G_{1}/S checkpoint, the G_{2}/M checkpoint and the metaphase (mitotic) checkpoint. Another checkpoint is the Go checkpoint, in which the cells are checked for maturity. If the cells are not ready, they do not pass this checkpoint and will be discarded from dividing.

G_{1}/S transition is a rate-limiting step in the cell cycle and is also known as restriction point. This is where the cell checks whether it has enough raw materials to fully replicate its DNA (nucleotide bases, DNA synthase, chromatin, etc.). An unhealthy or malnourished cell will get stuck at this checkpoint.

The G_{2}/M checkpoint is where the cell ensures that it has enough cytoplasm and phospholipids for two daughter cells. But sometimes more importantly, it checks to see if it is the right time to replicate. There are some situations where many cells need to all replicate simultaneously (for example, a growing embryo should have a symmetric cell distribution until it reaches the mid-blastula transition). This is done by controlling the G_{2}/M checkpoint.

The metaphase checkpoint is a fairly minor checkpoint because a cell in metaphase has already committed to undergo mitosis. Nevertheless, it is important because in this checkpoint, the cell checks to ensure that the spindle has formed and that all of the chromosomes are aligned at the spindle equator before anaphase begins.

While these are the three "main" checkpoints, not all cells have to pass through each of these checkpoints in this order to replicate. Many types of cancer are caused by mutations that allow the cells to speed through the various checkpoints or even skip them altogether, going from the S to M to S phase almost consecutively. Because these cells have lost their checkpoints, any DNA mutations that may have occurred are disregarded and passed on to the daughter cells. This is one reason why cancer cells have a tendency to exponentially acquire mutations. Aside from cancer cells, many fully differentiated cell types no longer replicate so they leave the cell cycle and stay in G_{0} until their death, thus removing the need for cellular checkpoints. An alternative model of the cell cycle response to DNA damage has also been proposed, known as the postreplication checkpoint.

Checkpoint regulation plays an important role in an organism's development. In sexual reproduction, when egg fertilization occurs, when the sperm binds to the egg, it releases signalling factors that notify the egg that it has been fertilized. Among other things, this induces the now fertilized oocyte to return from its previously dormant G_{0} state back into the cell cycle and on to mitotic replication and division.

p53 plays an important role in triggering the control mechanisms at both G_{1}/S and G_{2}/M checkpoints. In addition to p53, checkpoint regulators are being heavily researched for their roles in cancer growth and proliferation.

== Fluorescence imaging of the cell cycle ==
Fluorescent proteins visualize the cell cycle progression. IFP2.0-hGem(1/110) fluorescence is shown in green and highlights the S/G_{2}/M phases. smURFP-hCdtI(30/120) fluorescence is shown in red and highlights the G_{0}/G_{1} phases.

Pioneering work by Atsushi Miyawaki and coworkers developed the fluorescent ubiquitination-based cell cycle indicator (FUCCI), which enables fluorescence imaging of the cell cycle. Originally, a green fluorescent protein, mAG, was fused to hGem(1/110) and an orange fluorescent protein (mKO_{2}) was fused to hCdt1(30/120). Note, these fusions are fragments that contain a nuclear localization signal and ubiquitination sites for degradation, but are not functional proteins. The green fluorescent protein is made during the S, G_{2}, or M phase and degraded during the G_{0} or G_{1} phase, while the orange fluorescent protein is made during the G_{0} or G_{1} phase and destroyed during the S, G_{2}, or M phase. A far-red and near-infrared FUCCI was developed using a cyanobacteria-derived fluorescent protein (smURFP) and a bacteriophytochrome-derived fluorescent protein (movie found at this link). Several modifications have been made to the original FUCCI system to improve its usability in several in vitro systems and model organisms. These advancements have increased the sensitivity and accuracy of cell cycle phase detection, enabling more precise assessments of cellular proliferation.

== Role in tumor formation ==
A disregulation of the cell cycle components may lead to tumor formation. As mentioned above, when some genes like the cell cycle inhibitors, RB, p53 etc. mutate, they may cause the cell to multiply uncontrollably, forming a tumor. Although the duration of cell cycle in tumor cells is equal to or longer than that of normal cell cycle, the proportion of cells that are in active cell division (versus quiescent cells in G_{0} phase) in tumors is much higher than that in normal tissue. Thus there is a net increase in cell number as the number of cells that die by apoptosis or senescence remains the same.

The cells which are actively undergoing cell cycle are targeted in cancer therapy as the DNA is relatively exposed during cell division and hence susceptible to damage by drugs or radiation. This fact is made use of in cancer treatment; by a process known as debulking, a significant mass of the tumor is removed which pushes a significant number of the remaining tumor cells from G_{0} to G_{1} phase (due to increased availability of nutrients, oxygen, growth factors etc.). Radiation or chemotherapy following the debulking procedure kills these cells which have newly entered the cell cycle.

The fastest cycling mammalian cells in culture, crypt cells in the intestinal epithelium, have a cycle time as short as 9 to 10 hours. Stem cells in resting mouse skin may have a cycle time of more than 200 hours. Most of this difference is due to the varying length of G_{1}, the most variable phase of the cycle. M and S do not vary much.

In general, cells are most radiosensitive in late M and G_{2} phases and most resistant in late S phase. For cells with a longer cell cycle time and a significantly long G_{1} phase, there is a second peak of resistance late in G_{1}. The pattern of resistance and sensitivity correlates with the level of sulfhydryl compounds in the cell. Sulfhydryls are natural substances that protect cells from radiation damage and tend to be at their highest levels in S and at their lowest near mitosis.

Homologous recombination (HR) is an accurate process for repairing DNA double-strand breaks. HR is nearly absent in G1 phase, is most active in S phase, and declines in G_{2}/M. Non-homologous end joining, a less accurate and more mutagenic process for repairing double strand breaks, is active throughout the cell cycle.

== In prokaryotes ==
Most prokaryotes (bacteria and archaea) reproduce by binary fission. Despite not having a cell nucleus and the complex systems for managing the nuclear envelope, prokaryotes still need to schedule its DNA replication and cell division properly in their own cell cycle mechanisms.

=== Bacteria ===
The bacterial cell cycle is traditionally divided into the B, C, and D phases:

Phase	Description
B	From birth to onset of DNA replication.
C	DNA replication and segregation.
D	Between the completion of DNA replication and finalization of cell division.

The bacterial cell cycle is regulated very differently from the eukaryotic one. A phase can be reached before the previous phase is completed. For example, in very fast-growing bacteria, a new round of DNA replication can begin before the cell division is even complete.

In bacteria that use FtsZ for division, chromosomal DNA replication happens concurrently with the assembly of the FtsZ ring and the broader divisome. DNA replication is required for properly positioning the FtsZ ring at one end of the cell; when DNA replication is prevented but FtsZ production is allowed to continue, the ring appears at the center of the cell.

=== Archaea ===
The archaeal cell cycle is quite comparable to the eukaryotic cell cycle, except there is no singular position for a resting (G_{0}) phase and two separate cell division phases.

State	Phase	Description
Interphase	G_{1}	Cell growth.
Interphase	S	DNA replication.
Interphase	G_{2}	Growth and preparation for division.
Cell division	M	DNA segregates in a poorly-understood mechanism (likely via ParA-like ATPases). A ring is assembled at the future division site: In archaea that use CdvA, the ESCRT-III polymers CdvA and CdvB assemble at the future division site, then CdvA is replaced by CdvB1 and CdvB2.; In archaea that use FtsZ, FtsZ1 forms a ring at the future division site.
Cell division	D	In archaea that use ESCRT-III, Vps4 causes CdvB to dissociate from the ring and become degraded by the proteosome. The CdvB1/B2 ring contracts, fininalizing the division.; In archaea that use FtsZ, FtsZ2 is recruited to the FtsZ1 ring and anchored to the membrane by SepF. The FtsZ1/Z2 ring contracts, fininalizing the division.

There is a great deal of diversity in cell cycle organization among archaea. The TACK archaea (which include Sulfolobus) have a well-ordered cell cycle, with Sulfolobus usually arrested at the G_{2} phase during the stationary phase or by external stimuli. The Euryarchaeota tend to be more relaxed with many polyploid cells, but Methanothermobacter thermautotrophicus stands out for having strictly diploid and tetraploid phases.

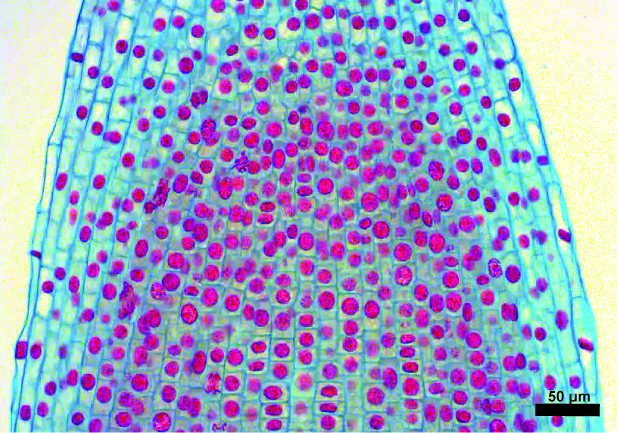
Light microscope image of a histologically stained allium onion root tip showing nuclear cells in a dividing meristem region at 20x.

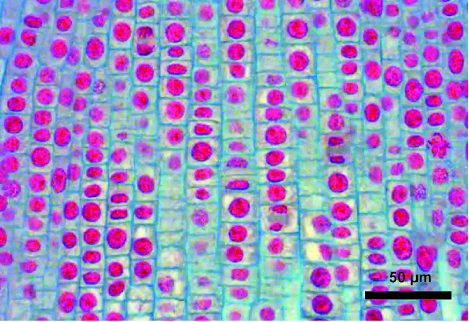
Light microscope image of a histologically stained allium onion root tip showing nuclear cells in a dividing meristem region at 40x.

Like in eukaryotes, proteolysis (espeicially the proteosome) is central to cell cycle progression, as is DNA replication. Transcription of cell division proteins and DNA replication machinery exhibit a cyclic pattern in sync with the cell cycle, but it is not totally clear what transcription factors (TFs) are causing this effect. Most species contain bacterial-style TFs that target specific genes, with some ribbon-helix-helix (RHH) TFs especially implicated in generating the cycle. Some species contain homologs of eukaryotic cell cycle-related transcription factors (TFB2 in TACK, E2F in Asgard).

== Cell cycle evolution ==
=== Evolution of the genome ===
The cell cycle must duplicate all cellular constituents and equally partition them into two daughter cells. Many constituents, such as proteins and ribosomes, are produced continuously throughout the cell cycle (except during M-phase). However, the chromosomes and other associated elements like MTOCs, are duplicated just once during the cell cycle. A central component of the cell cycle is its ability to coordinate the continuous and periodic duplications of different cellular elements, which evolved with the formation of the genome.

The pre-cellular environment contained functional and self-replicating RNAs. All RNA concentrations depended on the concentrations of other RNAs that might be helping or hindering the gathering of resources. In this environment, growth was simply the continuous production of RNAs. These pre-cellular structures would have had to contend with parasitic RNAs, issues of inheritance, and copy-number control of specific RNAs.

Partitioning "genomic" RNA from "functional" RNA helped solve these problems. The fusion of multiple RNAs into a genome gave a template from which functional RNAs were cleaved. Now, parasitic RNAs would have to incorporate themselves into the genome, a much greater barrier, in order to survive. Controlling the copy number of genomic RNA also allowed RNA concentration to be determined through synthesis rates and RNA half-lives, instead of competition. Separating the duplication of genomic RNAs from the generation of functional RNAs allowed for much greater duplication fidelity of genomic RNAs without compromising the production of functional RNAs. Finally, the replacement of genomic RNA with DNA, which is a more stable molecule, allowed for larger genomes. The transition from self-catalysis enzyme synthesis to genome-directed enzyme synthesis was a critical step in cell evolution, and had lasting implications on the cell cycle, which must regulate functional synthesis and genomic duplication in very different ways.

=== Cyclin-dependent kinase and cyclin evolution ===
Cell-cycle progression is controlled by the oscillating concentrations of different cyclins and the resulting molecular interactions from the various cyclin-dependent kinases (CDKs). In yeast, just one CDK (Cdc28 in S. cerevisiae and Cdc2 in S. pombe) controls the cell cycle. However, in animals, whole families of CDKs have evolved. Cdk1 controls entry to mitosis and Cdk2, Cdk4, and Cdk6 regulate entry into S phase. Despite the evolution of the CDK family in animals, these proteins have related or redundant functions. For example, cdk2 cdk4 cdk6 triple knockout mice cells can still progress through the basic cell cycle. cdk1 knockouts are lethal, which suggests an ancestral CDK1-type kinase ultimately controlling the cell cycle.

Arabidopsis thaliana has a Cdk1 homolog called CDKA;1, however cdka;1 A. thaliana mutants are still viable, running counter to the opisthokont pattern of CDK1-type kinases as essential regulators controlling the cell cycle. Plants also have a unique group of B-type CDKs, whose functions may range from development-specific functions to major players in mitotic regulation.

=== G1/S checkpoint evolution ===
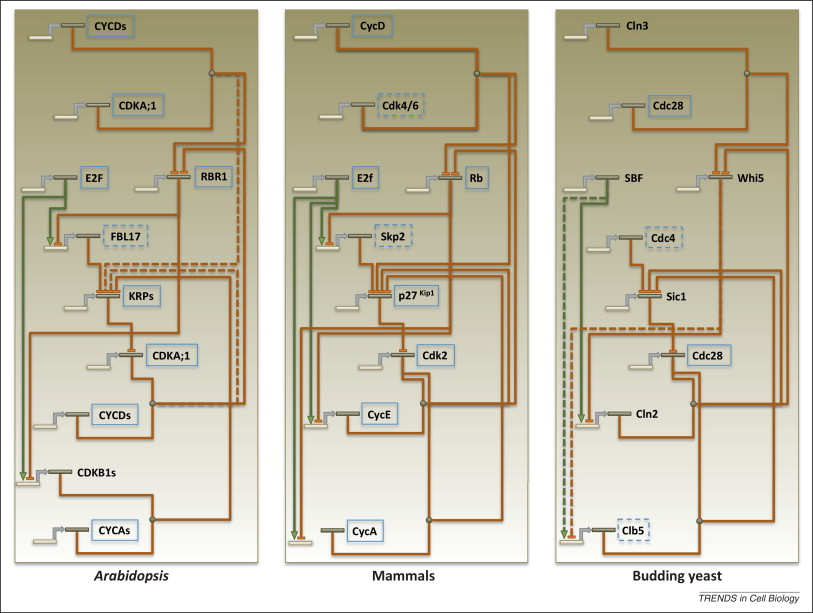
Overviews of the G1/S transition control networks in plants, animals, and yeast. All three show striking network topology similarities, even though individual proteins in the network have very little sequence similarity.

The G1/S checkpoint is the point at which the cell commits to division through the cell cycle. Complex regulatory networks lead to the G1/S transition decision. Across opisthokonts, there are both highly diverged protein sequences as well as strikingly similar network topologies.

Entry into S-phase in both yeast and animals is controlled by the levels of two opposing regulators. The networks regulating these transcription factors are double-negative feedback loops and positive feedback loops in both yeast and animals. Additional regulation of the regulatory network for the G1/S checkpoint in yeast and animals includes the phosphorylation/de-phosphorylation of CDK-cyclin complexes. The sum of these regulatory networks creates a hysteretic and bistable scheme, despite the specific proteins being highly diverged. For yeast, Whi5 must be suppressed by Cln3 phosphorylation for SBF to be expressed, while in animals Rb must be suppressed by the Cdk4/6-cyclin D complex for E2F to be expressed. Both Rb and Whi5 inhibit transcript through the recruitment of histone deacetylase proteins to promoters. Both proteins additionally have multiple CDK phosphorylation sites through which they are inhibited. However, these proteins share no sequence similarity.

Studies in A. thaliana extend our knowledge of the G1/S transition across eukaryotes as a whole. Plants also share a number of conserved network features with opisthokonts, and many plant regulators have direct animal homologs. For example, plants also need to suppress Rb for E2F translation in the network. These conserved elements of the plant and animal cell cycles may be ancestral in eukaryotes. While yeast share a conserved network topology with plants and animals, the highly diverged nature of yeast regulators suggests possible rapid evolution along the yeast lineage.

== See also ==
- Cell cycle withdrawal
- Cellular model
- Eukaryotic DNA replication
- Mitotic catastrophe
- Origin recognition complex
- Retinoblastoma protein
- Synchronous culture – synchronization of cell cultures
- Wee1
