= Phycocyanobilin:ferredoxin oxidoreductase =

phycocyanobilin:ferredoxin oxidoreductase

Identifiers
- EC no.: 1.3.7.5
- CAS no.: 347401-12-1

Databases
- IntEnz: IntEnz view
- BRENDA: BRENDA entry
- ExPASy: NiceZyme view
- KEGG: KEGG entry
- MetaCyc: metabolic pathway
- PRIAM: profile
- PDB structures: RCSB PDB PDBe PDBsum
- Gene Ontology: AmiGO / QuickGO
Search
- PMC: articles
- PubMed: articles
- NCBI: proteins

In enzymology, phycocyanobilin:ferredoxin oxidoreductase (PcyA, EC 1.3.7.5) is an enzyme that catalyzes the chemical reaction

biliverdin
+ 4 reduced
ferredoxin
(2R,3Z)-phycocyanobilin
+ 4 oxidised
ferredoxin

The two substrates of this enzyme are biliverdin and reduced ferredoxin. Its products are (2R,3Z)-phycocyanobilin and oxidized ferredoxin.

This enzyme belongs to the family of oxidoreductases, specifically those acting on the CH-CH group of donor with an iron-sulfur protein as acceptor. The systematic name of this enzyme class is (3Z)-phycocyanobilin:ferredoxin oxidoreductase. This enzyme participates in the catabolism of heme.

== Structural studies ==
As of late 2007, 3 structures have been solved for this class of enzymes, with PDB accession codes 2D1E, 2DKE, and 2G18.
