= Hiroshi Tamiya =

Japanese plant biochemist and microbiologist

- Born: January 5, 1903
- Died: March 20, 1984 (aged 81)
- Citizenship: Japan
- Education: Tokyo University
- Scientific career
- Fields: Biochemistry, Microbiology

Hiroshi Tamiya (田宮 博, Tamiya Hiroshi; born January 5, 1903, Tokyo; died March 20, 1984) was an important Japanese plant biochemist and microbiologist. He is notable for mid-twentieth century research he did on the thermodynamics of the light-independent reactions of photosynthesis.

== Life ==
Tamiya was a student of Keita Shibata, a plant physiologist, as a student at Tokyo University. Andrew Benson, who was instrumental in understanding carbon fixation in plants considered Tamiya inspirational in his own success as a scientist. Tamiya worked and studied in Japan, Europe, and the United States, collaborating internationally with a variety of scientists.

After World War II, during the Allied Occupation of Japan, the Massachusetts Institute of Technology physicist Harry C. Kelly selected Tamiya to assist him in evaluating scientific research in Japan. The mission was largely in response to the destruction of cyclotrons by the United States Army acting out of fear the Japanese had been researching and developing a nuclear weapon during the war. One of the cyclotrons destroyed was an instrument that Tamiya required for his research.

In 1953 Tamiya, working with other Japanese scientists, developed techniques for the synchronous culture of the green algae Chlorella, a model organism used by Otto Heinrich Warburg whom Tamiya admired. Tamiya was able with it to culture algal cell lines that were all in the same developmental stage, a technique used by later scientists to decipher the life cycles of other single celled eukaryotic organisms.

In 1966 Tamiya was made a foreign associate member of the United States National Academy of Sciences. In 1977 he was given the Japanese Order of Culture for his contributions to science in Japan.
