= SmURFP =

Fluorescent proteins visualize the cell cycle progression. IFP2.0-hGem(1/110) fluorescence is shown in green and highlights the S/G_{2}/M phases. smURFP-hCdtI(30/120) fluorescence is shown in red and highlights the G_{0}/G_{1} phases.

Small ultra red fluorescent protein (smURFP) is a class of far-red fluorescent protein developed through directed evolution from a cyanobacterial (Trichodesmium erythraeum) phycobiliprotein, α-allophycocyanin. Native α-allophycocyanin requires an exogenous protein, known as a lyase, to attach the chromophore, phycocyanobilin. Phycocyanobilin is not present in mammalian cells. smURFP was evolved to covalently attach phycocyanobilin without a lyase and fluoresce, covalently attach biliverdin (ubiquitous to mammalian cells) and fluoresce, blue-shift fluorescence to match the organic fluorophore, Cy5, and not inhibit E. coli growth. smURFP was found after 12 rounds of random mutagenesis and manually screening 10,000,000 bacterial colonies.

== Properties ==
smURFP is a homodimer with absorption and emission maximum of 642 nm and 670 nm, respectively. A tandem dimer smURFP (TDsmURFP) was created and has similar properties to smURFP. smURFP is extremely stable with a protein degradation half-life of 17 hour and 33 hour without and with chromophore (biliverdin), respectively. This is comparable to the jellyfish-derived enhanced green fluorescent protein (eGFP) protein degradation half-life of 24 hour. smURFP is extremely photostable and outperforms mCherry and tdTomato in living cells. Single-molecule smURFPs emit twice as many photons before photobleaching than small-molecule dyes AlexaFluor647 and Cyanine5. The extinction coefficient (180,000 M^{−1} cm^{−1}) of smURFP is extremely large and has a modest quantum yield (0.18), which makes it comparable biophysical brightness to eGFP and ~2-fold brighter than most red or far-red fluorescent proteins derived from coral. smURFP has the largest two-photon cross-section measured for a fluorescent protein. There are two peak cross-sections of 1,060 and 60 GM at 820 and 1,196 nm, respectively. Despite being a homodimer, all tested N- and C- terminal fusions show correct cellular localization, including the difficult fusion to α-tubulin and Lamin B1 (Figure). smURFP is named after the Smurfs, due to its light blue appearance in white light.

The crystal structure of the smURFP (PDB: 7UQA) was determined and used to understand the directed evolution. smURFP was also compared to the parental α-allophycocyanin. The crystal structure of a smURFP mutant (PDB: 6FZN) was published by Fuenzalida-Werner et al. The mutants show significantly larger chromophore pockets and protein volume, which results in diminished quantum yield. A 2020 review discusses recent applications of smURFP as a genetically encoded or exogenous probe for in vivo imaging and discusses problems with biliverdin availability.

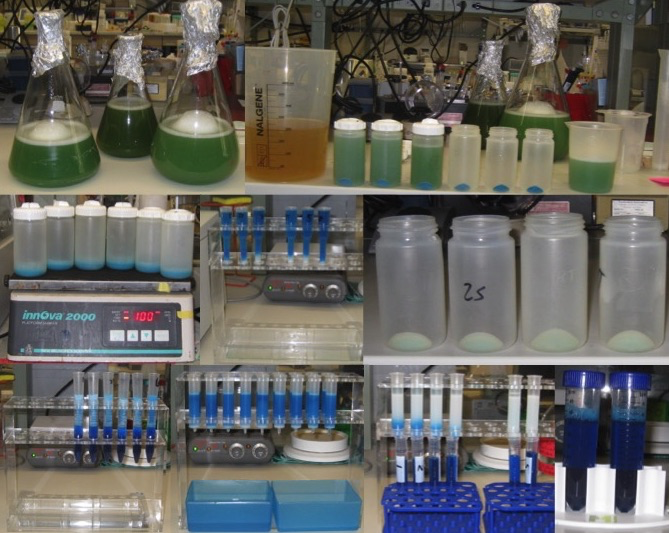
Image shows E. coli expressing smURFP, pelleting of E. coli, removal of media, E. coli lysis, smURFP binding to NiNTA, smURFP elution, and buffer exchange.

== smURFP used as nanoparticles, exogenous probes, and in vitro assays ==
Free smURFP is 2-3 nm in diameter. smURFP nanoparticles of ~10-14 nm diameter can be synthesized in an oil and water emulsion and remain fluorescent. These fluorescent protein nanoparticles are stable in living mice and useful for non-invasive tumor fluorescence imaging.

Purified smURFP survives ultrasound and fixation to allow fluorescence imaging of macromolecule delivery by ultrasound into corneas.

Free smURFP, purified protein and not genetically encoded, can be encapsulated into viruses and used for non-invasive, fluorescence imaging of biodistribution in living mice.

smURFP covalently attaches biliverdin to turn on fluorescence and is inherently a biliverdin sensor. Researchers showed purified smURFP has a limit of detection of 0.4 nM for biliverdin in human serum. smURFP allows for the creation of in vitro assays to detect enzyme activity. An assay was developed for thrombin with a detection range of 1.07 aM–0.01 mM and a limit of detection of 0.2 aM.

Tandem dimer smURFP (TDsmURFP) was used as an exogenous fluorescent marker to label the seven-transmembrane receptor Smoothened (SMO). TDsmURFP was purified from E. coli and attached to SMO by sortase-mediated conjugation for fluorescence-activated cell sorting (FACS). This novel, exogenous fluorescent protein labeling avoids screening multiple protein insertion sites, organic solvents, and chemical reactions that misfold, inactivate, or degrade proteins.

== smURFP is a self-labeling protein ==
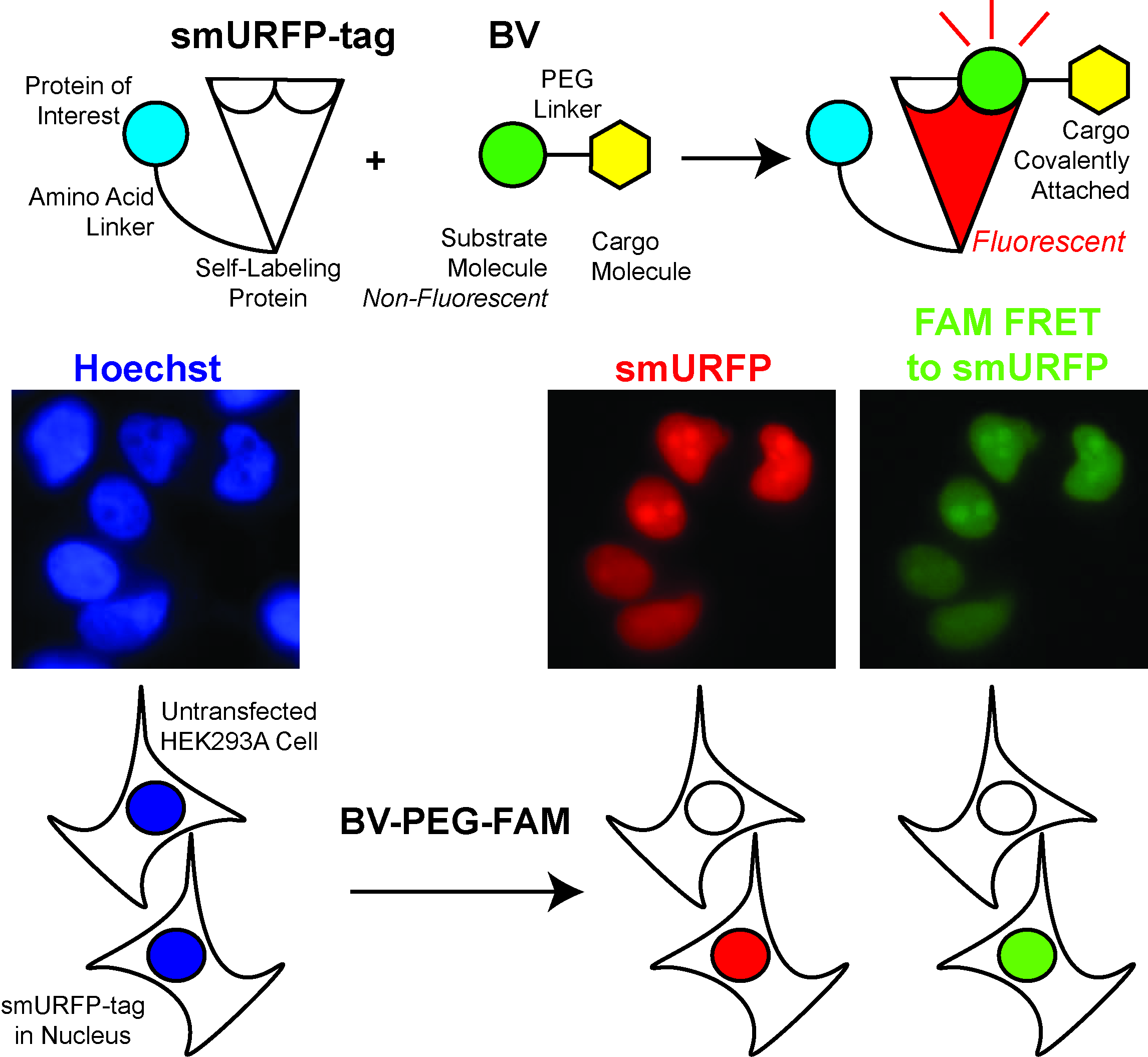
The small Ultra-Red Fluorescent Protein (smURFP) is a self-labeling protein. The substrate is fluorogenic, fluoresces when attached, and quenches fluorescent cargo. The smURFP-tag has novel properties for tool development.

The small Ultra-Red Fluorescent Protein (smURFP) is a self-labeling protein like Halo-, SNAP-, and CLIP-tags. The smURFP-tag accepts a biliverdin substrate modified on a carboxylate with a polyethylene glycol (PEG) linker to the cargo molecule. Unlike the Halo-, SNAP-, and CLIP-tags that use the substrate to only covalently attach the cargo molecule, biliverdin is fluorogenic, and fluorescence is turned "on" with covalent attachment to the smURFP-tag to allow far-red fluorescence tracking of cargo molecule in living cells. Biliverdin also quenches fluorescein cargo to allow for imaging without substrate removal. Biliverdin modification on a single carboxylate creates a neutral molecule that passes the outer and nuclear membrane of mammalian cells.

== Chromophore availability in cells and mice ==
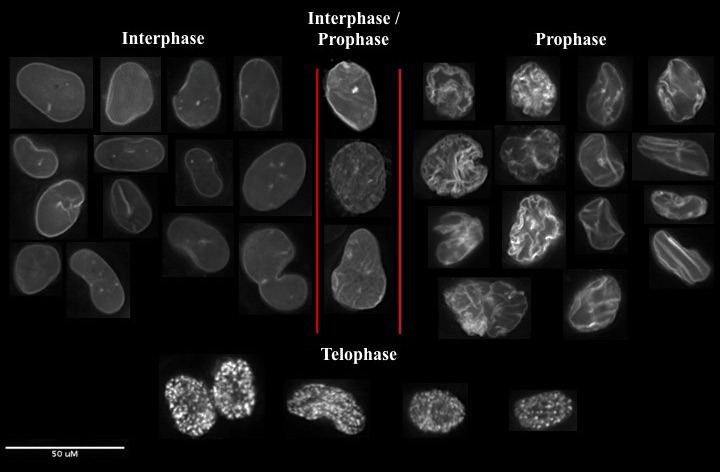
smURFP was genetically fused to human, lamin B1 to show the nuclear envelope with fluorescence. Localization of the Lamin B1 protein changes during different phases of the cell cycle.

Despite showing comparable biophysical brightness to eGFP when purified protein was normalized, this was not seen in living cells. This suggested there was not enough chromophore (biliverdin) within cells. Addition of biliverdin increased fluorescence, but smURFP with biliverdin was not comparable to eGFP. Biliverdin has two carboxylates at neutral pH and this is inhibiting cellular entry. Biliverdin dimethyl ester is a more hydrophobic analog and readily crosses the cellular membrane. smURFP with biliverdin dimethyl ester shows comparable fluorescence to eGFP in cells and is brighter than bacterial phytochrome fluorescent proteins.

The free chromophore can be differentiated from chromophore attached to smURFP by fluorescence lifetime imaging (FLIM) in living cells. Free biliverdin dimethyl ester (BVMe2) has a fluorescence lifetime of 0.586 ns, while BVMe2 attached to smURFP has a fluorescence lifetime of 1.27 ns.

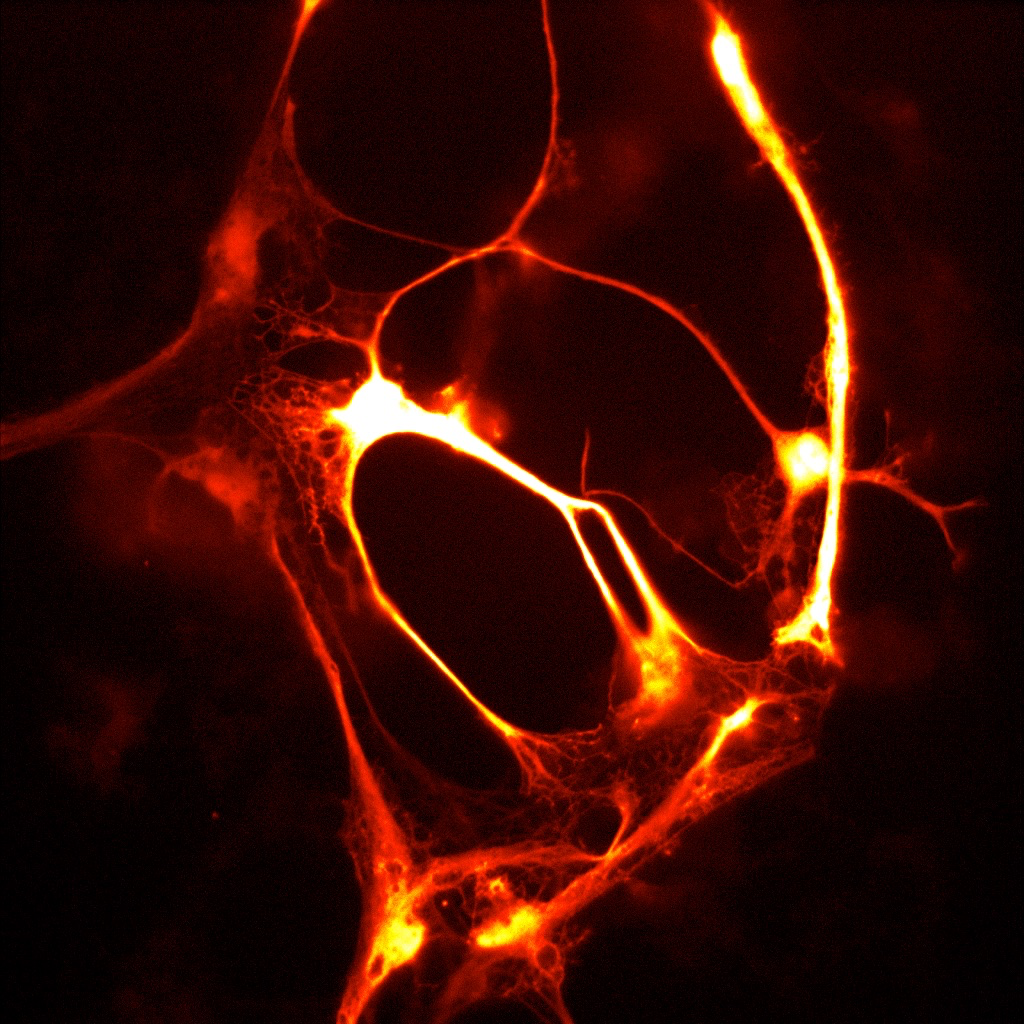
smURFP expressed in neuronal culture does not show aggregation in lysosomes, which was seen with the fluorescent protein, mCherry.

In mice, smURFP fluorescence is visible in HT1080 tumor xenografts without exogenous biliverdin, but fluorescence is less than coral-derived red fluorescent proteins, mCherry and mCardinal. Visible fluorescence is not always usable fluorescence and fluorescent proteins should always be compared to other useful, genetically encoded fluorescent proteins. Intravenous injection of exogenous biliverdin or biliverdin dimethyl ester does not increase fluorescence of smURFP expressed in tumors after 1 to 24 hours. Mass spectrometry showed that the ester groups were rapidly removed from biliverdin dimethyl ester. Addition of 25 μM biliverdin or biliverdin dimethyl ester dramatically increased fluorescence of excised tumors and smURFP is present without chromophore. Further research is necessary to optimize chromophore availability in mice to obtain fluorescence comparable or greater than coral-derived red fluorescent proteins.

== Adding chromophore to cells ==
Biliverdin dimethyl ester, biliverdin, or phycocyanobilin is dissolved in DMSO at a concentration of 5 mM. The solution is very dark and pipette vigorously to ensure all is dissolved. Biliverdin dimethyl ester is not soluble in common buffers, including phosphate buffered saline (PBS) or Hank's balanced salt solution (HBSS). Add 1-5 μM biliverdin dimethyl ester in media or buffer containing 10% fetal bovine serum (FBS). Add 25 μM biliverdin (not as membrane permeant) to cells. Biliverdin does not saturate the smURFP sites and does not achieve maximum fluorescence intensity. Biliverdin dimethyl ester should be used to get maximum fluorescence intensity. Incubate smURFP with chromophore for as long as possible to increase protein accumulation caused by enhanced protein stability with chromophore. Leave chromophore for a minimum of 3 hours and 24 h is recommended. Remove chromophore, wash with media containing 10% FBS, and image in media lacking phenol red or imaging buffer.

== smURFP genetically encoded biosensors ==
Far Red & Near Infrared FUCCI visualizes the birth of a multinucleated cell, which is common in many cancer cells.

Kinase FRET sensor. smURFP is a useful acceptor for many red fluorescent proteins due to spectral overlap. A rationally designed red fluorescent protein, stagRFP, allows for easier creation of FRET sensors. stagRFP is a useful FRET donor to the far-red acceptor smURFP and an ERK kinase FRET reporter was created with an average response of ~15%. The new sensor allowed for simultaneous visualization of three kinases, Src, Akt, ERK, in a single cell. Fluorescently imaging the cell cycle. Pioneering work by Atsushi Miyawaki and coworkers developed the fluorescent ubiquitination-based cell cycle indicator (FUCCI), which enables fluorescence imaging of the cell cycle. Originally, a green fluorescent protein, mAG, was fused to hGem(1/110) and an orange fluorescent protein (mKO_{2}) was fused to hCdt1(30/120). Note, these fusions are fragments that contain a nuclear localization signal and ubiquitination sites for degradation, but are not functional proteins. The green fluorescent protein is made during the S, G_{2}, or M phase and degraded during the G_{0} or G_{1} phase, while the orange fluorescent protein is made during the G_{0} or G_{1} phase and destroyed during the S, G_{2}, or M phase. A far-red and near-infrared FUCCI was developed using a cyanobacteria-derived fluorescent protein (smURFP) and a bacteriophytochrome-derived fluorescent protein (movie found at this link).

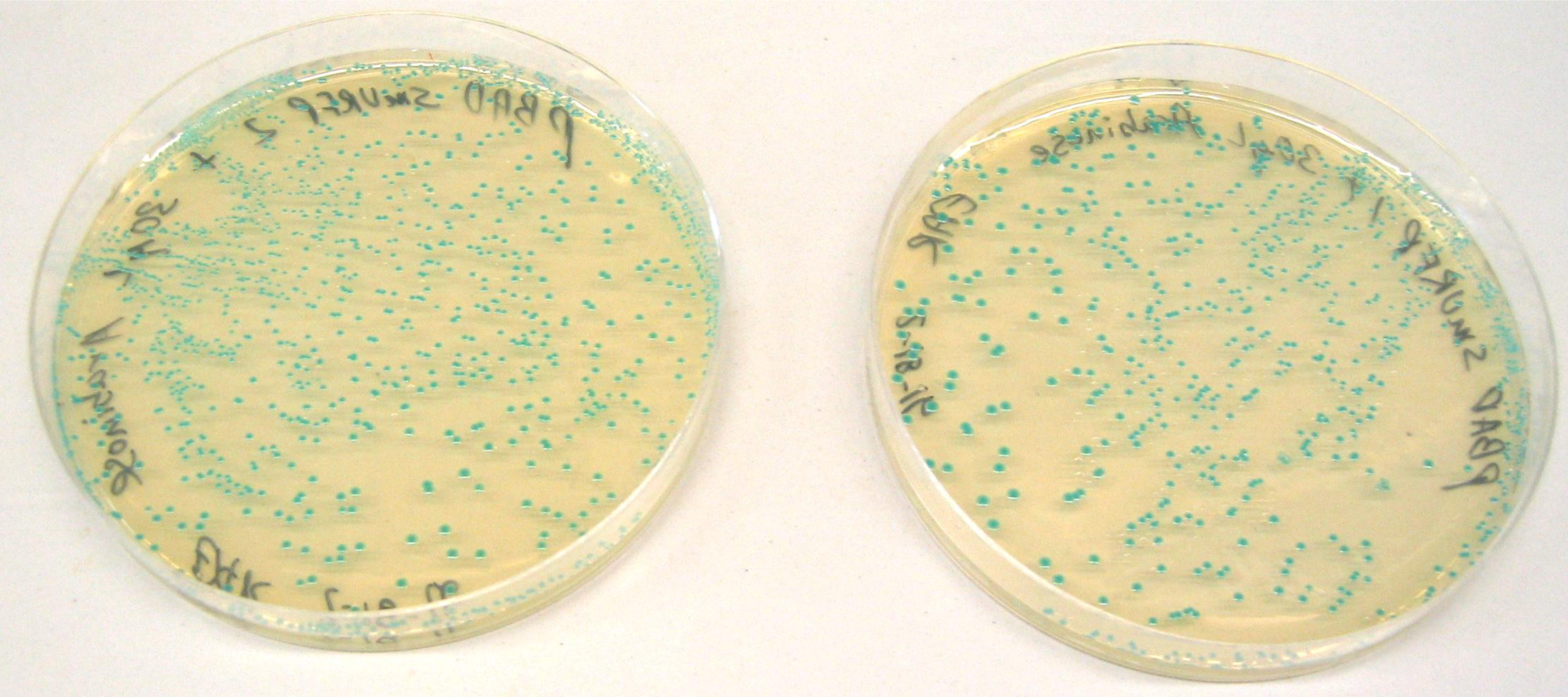
smURFP (light-blue) expressed in E. coli.
