= Setra Systems =

Setra Systems, Inc.
- Type: Subsidiary of Fortive
- Traded as: NYSE: FTV; S&P 500 Component
- Industry: Electronics; Industrial manufacturing
- Founded: 1967; 59 years ago
- Headquarters: Boxborough, Massachusetts, U.S.
- Products: Pressure Sensors, Current Sensors, Indicators
- Number of employees: 201-500
- Parent: Fortive
- Website: www.setra.com

Setra Systems is an American electronics company that manufactures electronic instruments that measure pressure, acceleration, and weight. The company's products are used chiefly in industrial manufacturing. Setra Systems is a fully owned subsidiary of Fortive since 2000.

Setra Technology Park is located in Boxborough, MA. Setra's range of products also cater to agricultural, medical, and semi-conductor industries apart from the existing OEM, barometric, HVAC/R, environmental, test and measurement, food and pharmaceutical industries.

== History ==
Founded in 1967, Setra Systems, Inc. is a USA-based designer and manufacturer of pressure, humidity and current sensing products for the HVAC industry. The company was founded by Yao-Tzu Li and Shih-Ying Lee, brothers and former professors of engineering at MIT, who co-developed the variable capacitance transduction principle, the force sensing technology which is the basis of Setra's products.

In 2001, Setra was acquired by Danaher Corporation.

== Products ==
Setra's range of products include differential pressure transmitters, low differential pressure transducer, wet-to-wet differential pressure transducer, gauge pressure transmitters, current switches and sensors, humidity sensors and vacuum sensors. The engineering and research efforts of Setra have been put into the development of transmitters and transducers designed using the variable capacitive transduction principle.

Setra has applications in various industries such as OEM, barometric, HVAC/R, environmental, test and measurement, food and pharmaceutical industries and has ventured into building automation, agricultural, medical and semi-conductor industries.
