= Charles Stark Draper =

American engineer (1901–1987)

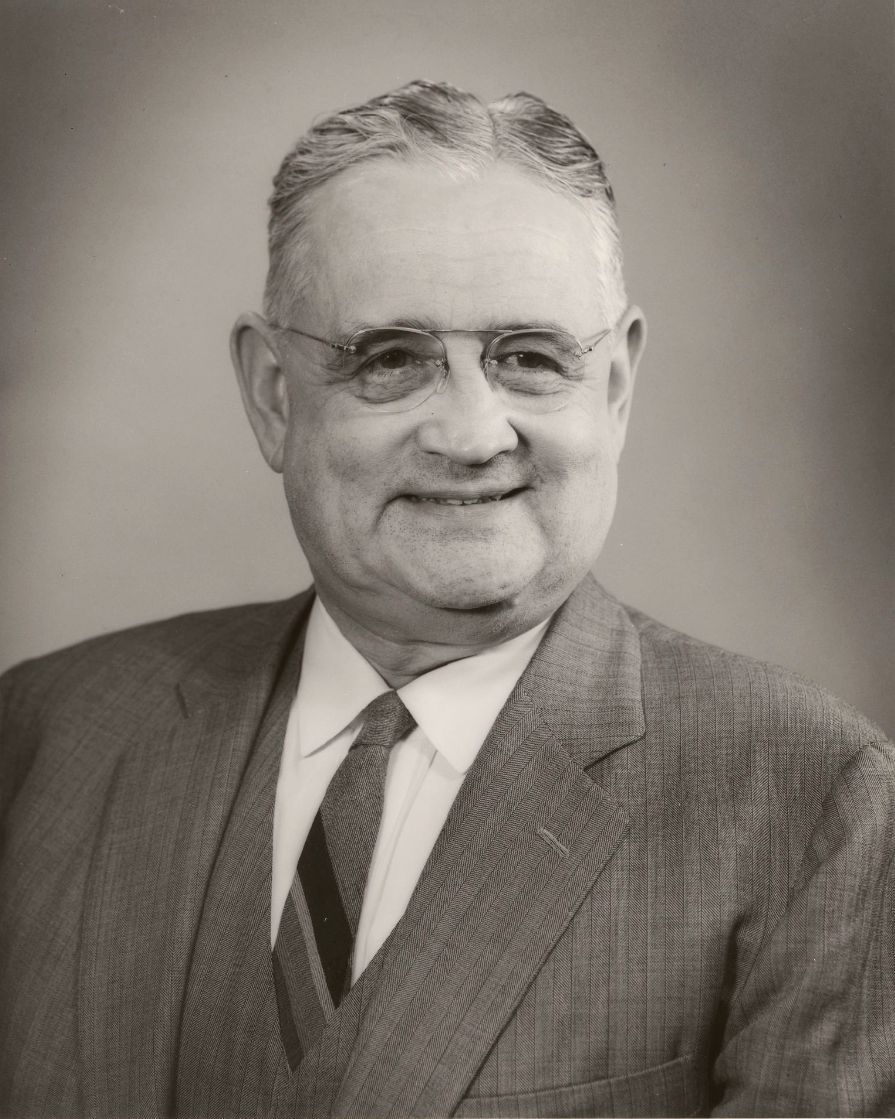
- Born: October 2, 1901; Windsor, Missouri, U.S.
- Died: July 25, 1987 (aged 85); Cambridge, Massachusetts, U.S.
- Education: MIT (B.S., 1926; M.S., 1936; Sc.D., 1938); Stanford University (B.A., Psychology, 1922)
- Awards: Magellanic Premium (1959); National Medal of Science (1964); Daniel Guggenheim Medal (1966); Rufus Oldenburger Medal (1971); Allan D. Emil Memorial Award (1977); Control Heritage Award (1981)
- Scientific career
- Fields: Control theory
- Workplaces: Massachusetts Institute of Technology
- Thesis: The physical processes accompanying detonation in the internal combustion engine (1938)
- Doctoral advisor: Philip M. Morse
- Doctoral students: Yao-Tzu Li; Robert Seamans

Charles Stark "Doc" Draper (October 2, 1901 – July 25, 1987) was an American scientist and engineer, known as the "father of inertial navigation". He was the founder and director of the Massachusetts Institute of Technology's Instrumentation Laboratory, which was later spun out of MIT to become the non-profit Charles Stark Draper Laboratory.

Beginning in the 1940s, Draper developed inertial guidance systems for aircraft. In World War II, Draper invented the first lead-computing gunsights for aircraft, and later applying similar technology to missile guidance systems. In 1954, Draper's application of inertial controls to computerized autopilot allowed the Instrumentation Lab to conduct the first coast-to-coast unmanned flight. The lab also made the Apollo Moon landings possible through the Apollo Guidance Computer it designed for NASA. In 1960, Draper was one of the scientists recognized as Time magazine's Men of the Year.

== Early life and education ==
Draper was born in Windsor, Missouri, to Charles A. Draper (1864–1945) and Martha W. Draper (née Stark) (1865–1939).

He attended the University of Missouri in 1917, then transferred to Stanford University, California in 1919, from which he earned a B.A. in psychology in 1922. He matriculated at MIT in 1922, earning a Bachelor of Science degree in electrochemical engineering (1926), and Master of Science (1928), and a Doctor of Science (1938) degrees in physics. Charles Stark Draper's relatives were prominent in his home state of Missouri, including his cousin, Governor Lloyd C. Stark.

== Career ==
Draper began teaching at MIT as an assistant professor. He was appointed a full professor in aeronautical engineering in 1939. It was here that he founded the Instrumentation Laboratory in the 1930s, spun off in 1973 as the Charles Stark Draper Laboratory.

Draper's interest in flight instrumentation was influenced by becoming a pilot in the 1930s: although he failed to become an Air Corps pilot, he learned to fly by enrolling in a civilian course. Draper was one of the pioneers of inertial navigation, a technology used in aircraft, space vehicles, and submarines that enables such vehicles to navigate by sensing changes in direction and speed using gyroscopes and accelerometers. A pioneering figure in aerospace engineering, he contributed to the Apollo space program with his knowledge of guidance systems.

In 1961 Draper and the Instrumentation Lab were awarded the first contract given out for the Apollo program to send humans to the Moon, which was announced by President John F. Kennedy on 25 May of that year. This led to the creation of the Apollo Guidance Computer, a one-cubic-foot computer that controlled the navigation and guidance of the lunar module to the Moon on nine launches, six of which landed on the Moon's surface.

Draper taught and conducted research at MIT until January 1970, devoting most of his energy during his final decade to completing the Apollo computers and software.

Draper was inducted into the National Inventors Hall of Fame in 1981 for his multiple inventions and scientific contributions.

== Professional associations ==
Draper was a member of the U.S. National Academy of Engineering of the National Academy of Sciences as well as the French Academy of Sciences. He had served as president of the International Academy of Astronautics, and. was a member of the American Physical Society, the American Academy of Arts and Sciences, the American Society of Mechanical Engineers, and the Institute of Electrical and Electronics Engineers.

== Awards ==
Draper received more than 70 honors and awards, including the Howard N. Potts Medal in 1960, the Golden Plate Award of the American Academy of Achievement in 1961, the National Medal of Science from President Lyndon B. Johnson in 1964, the ASME's Rufus Oldenburger Medal in 1971, the Robert H. Goddard Trophy in 1978, the AACC's Richard E. Bellman Control Heritage Award and the Smithsonian's Langley Gold Medal in 1981, and the National Academy of Engineering's Founders Award. His renown was international, and was recognized by many foreign countries, including France, United Kingdom, Germany, Switzerland, Czechoslovakia, and the Soviet Union.

Draper was inducted as a member of the inaugural class to the International Space Hall of Fame.

Draper was inducted into the National Aviation Hall of Fame in 1981.

== Legacy ==
He died in the Mount Auburn Hospital in Cambridge, Massachusetts, at age 85. He was eulogized as "one of the foremost engineers of our time", and Howard Wesley Johnson, Chairman of the MIT Corporation, credited him for creating a "whole new industry in inertial instruments and systems for airplanes, ships, submarines, missiles, satellites and space vehicles".

=== Charles Stark Draper Prize ===
The National Academy of Engineering established the Charles Stark Draper Prize in 1988 on behalf of the namesake's laboratory at MIT. The prize, which is awarded annually and consists of $500,000 in cash, a gold medallion, and a hand-inscribed certificate, aims to "increase public understanding of the contributions of engineering and technology to the welfare and freedom of humanity". Endowment for the prize was provided by the Charles Stark Draper Laboratory.

== See also ==
- List of members of the National Academy of Engineering (Aerospace)
- Charles Stark Draper Laboratory
- Charles Stark Draper Prize
- Inertial navigation system (INS)
- List of Draper Prize Winners
