= Synchronous culture =

A synchronous or synchronized culture is a microbiological culture or a cell culture that contains cells that are all in the same growth stage.

As numerous factors influence the cell cycle (some of them stochastic) normal cultures have cells in all stages of the cell cycle. Obtaining a culture with a unified cell-cycle stage is useful for biological research where a particular stage in the cell cycle is desired (such as the culturing of parasitized cells). Since cells are too small for certain research techniques, a synchronous culture can be treated as a single cell; the number of cells in the culture can be easily estimated, and quantitative experimental results can simply be divided in the number of cells to obtain values that apply to a single cell. Synchronous cultures have been extensively used to address questions regarding cell cycle and growth, and the effects of various factors on these.

== Methods ==
Synchronous cultures can be obtained in several ways:

- External conditions can be changed, so as to arrest growth of all cells in the culture, and then changed again to resume growth. The newly growing cells are now all starting to grow at the same stage, and they are synchronized. For example, for photosynthetic cells, light can be eliminated for several hours and then re-introduced. Another method is to eliminate an essential nutrient from the growth medium and later re-introduce it.
- Cell growth can also be arrested using chemical growth inhibitors. After growth has completely stopped for all cells, the inhibitor can be removed from the culture and the cells then begin to grow synchronously. Nocodazole, for example, has been used in biological research for synchronization, although some evidence suggests it may lack such ability to synchronize cells.
- Cells in different growth stages have different physical properties. Cells in a culture can thus be physically separated based on their density or size, for instance. This can be achieved using centrifugation (for density) or filtration (for size).
- In the Helmstetter-Cummings technique, a bacterial culture is filtered through a membrane. Most bacteria pass through, but some remain bound to the membrane. Fresh medium is then applied to the membrane and the bound bacteria start to grow. Newborn bacteria that detach from the membrane are now all at the same stage of growth; they are collected in a flask that now harbors a synchronous culture.
