= Tung Hua Lin =

Chinese-American aerospace engineer

- Traditional Chinese: 林同驊
- Simplified Chinese: 林同骅
Transcriptions
Standard Mandarin
- Hanyu Pinyin: Lín Tónghuá
- Wade–Giles: Lin^{2} T'ung^{2}-hua^{2}

Tung Hua Lin (May 26, 1911 – June 18, 2007) was a Chinese-American aerospace and structural engineer best known for designing China's first twin engine aircraft during World War II.

== Early life and career ==
Lin was born in Chongqing in May 1911. His grandfather was head of the local telegraph agency. In 1914, his family moved to Beijing. He enrolled in Huiwen High School in 1924, graduating in 1928. After graduation, he entered Yenching University, majoring in physics, but the following year transferred to Chiaotung University's Tangshan, Hebei campus (present-day Southwest Jiaotong University), graduating with a Bachelor of Science degree in 1933. He then won a Chinese National Fellowship to study in the United States in 1933. He completed his master of science degree at the Massachusetts Institute of Technology in 1936. He returned to teach at Tsing Hua University in 1937. His cousin Tung-Yen Lin was also one of the outstanding structural engineers of the 20th century.

== World War II ==
Lin was asked to design aircraft during World War II. His production team worked in a cave to protect against bombing by the Japanese. He lacked modern design tools such as wind tunnels to test the aircraft. The C-0101 which he designed and constructed, largely from bamboo and wood, was test flown from Chungking to Chengdu on November 18, 1944. Lin was awarded a medal by the Chinese government for his efforts.

== Postwar career ==
After the war, Lin was a member of a mission to design jet aircraft in China. They approached the St. Louis, Missouri-based McDonnell Aircraft about mass-producing their aircraft, but as the price quoted was too expensive, they instead chose Gloucester, England's Gloster Aircraft Company; Lin was part of a 20-person design team who moved to England to work with them in 1947. However, due to a lack of funding, they had to halt production in 1949, whereupon Lin moved to the United States. There, he taught at the University of Detroit while studying for his doctorate at the University of Michigan. He became a professor at the University of California, Los Angeles in 1955; while there, he published the Theory of Inelastic Structure in 1968. He retired in 1978. In May 1981, Dr. Shu-Liang Bob Wu is the last Ph.D. student that Professor Lin help to get Ph.D. degree during Professor Lin's tenure years in UCLA. The Ph.D. dissertation subject is "Stress-strain time relations under radial loadings, and plastic strain under static tension and cyclic torsion for Aluminum alloy" . It is noted that this is the only Ph.D. dissertation that Professor Lin Co-Chairmen with Professor David Okrent. Both are member of National Academy of Engineering.

Lin was awarded the Theodore von Kármán Medal by the American Society of Civil Engineers in 1988. His research on earthquake stress in construction materials led to a fellowship in the National Academy of Engineering in 1990. Taiwan's Academia Sinica named him as a member in 1996. He died of heart failure in June 2007.

== See also ==
- Tung-Yen Lin

== Publications ==
- Lin, T. H. (1968). Theory of Inelastic Structures. Wiley. ISBN 0-471-53540-0.
  - Chinese edition: Lin, T.H. (2006). 非弹性结构理论 (in Chinese). Translated by Fan Wentian. Beijing: China Railway Publishing House. ISBN 7-113-06964-9.
