= Biliverdin =

Green bile pigment

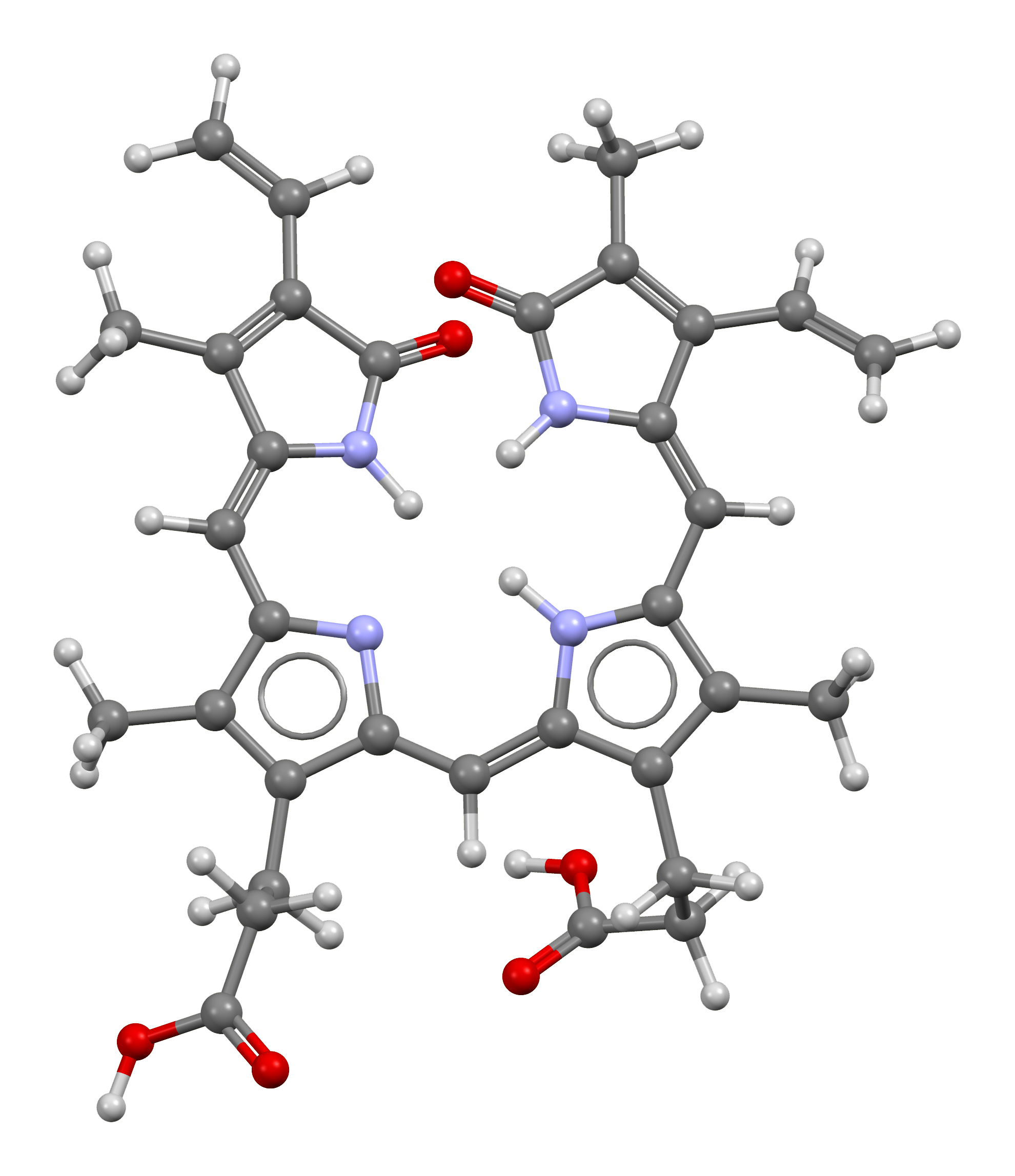

Names
- IUPAC name 3,3′-(2,17-Diethenyl-3,7,13,18-tetramethyl-1,19-dioxo-19,21,22,24-tetrahydro-1H-biline-8,12-diyl)dipropanoic acid
- Systematic IUPAC name 3,3′-([1^{2}(2)Z,4(5^{2})Z,6(7^{2})Z]-1^{3},7^{4}-Diethenyl-1^{4},3^{3},5^{4},7^{3}-tetramethyl-1^{5},7^{5}-dioxo-1^{1},1^{5},7^{1},7^{5}-tetrahydro-3^{1}H-1,7(2),3,5(2,5)-tetrapyrrolaheptaphane-1^{2}(2),4(5^{2}),6(7^{2})-triene-3^{4},5^{3}-diyl)dipropanoic acid

Identifiers
CAS Number	114-25-0
3D model (JSmol)	Interactive image
ChEBI	CHEBI:17033
ChEMBL	ChEMBL455477
ChemSpider	10628548
ECHA InfoCard	100.003.675
MeSH	Biliverdin
PubChem CID	251
UNII	O9MIA842K9
CompTox Dashboard (EPA)	DTXSID70883307
- InChI: InChI=1S/C33H34N4O6/c1-7-20-19(6)32(42)37-27(20)14-25-18(5)23(10-12-31(40)41)29(35-25)15-28-22(9-11-30(38)39)17(4)24(34-28)13-26-16(3)21(8-2)33(43)36-26/h7-8,13-15,35H,1-2,9-12H2,3-6H3,(H,36,43)(H,37,42)(H,38,39)(H,40,41)/b26-13-,27-14-,28-15- Key: QBUVFDKTZJNUPP-BBROENKCSA-N; InChI=1/C33H34N4O6/c1-7-20-19(6)32(42)37-27(20)14-25-18(5)23(10-12-31(40)41)29(35-25)15-28-22(9-11-30(38)39)17(4)24(34-28)13-26-16(3)21(8-2)33(43)36-26/h7-8,13-15,35H,1-2,9-12H2,3-6H3,(H,36,43)(H,37,42)(H,38,39)(H,40,41)/b26-13-,27-14-,28-15- Key: QBUVFDKTZJNUPP-BBROENKCBK
- SMILES: CC\1=C(/C(=C/C2=C(C(=C(N2)/C=C\3/C(=C(C(=O)N3)C)C=C)C)CCC(=O)O)/N/C1=C\C4=NC(=O)C(=C4C)C=C)CCC(=O)O

Properties
Chemical formula	C_{33}H_{34}N_{4}O_{6}
Molar mass	582.646
Appearance	Dark green plates or prisms with violet surface color
Melting point	> 300 °C

Hazards
- Occupational safety and health (OHS/OSH)
Main hazards	Irritant
Safety data sheet (SDS)	Sigma-Aldrich
- Except where otherwise noted, data are given for materials in their standard state (at 25 °C [77 °F], 100 kPa). verify (what is ?) Infobox references

Biliverdin (from the Latin for green bile) is a green tetrapyrrolic bile pigment, and is a product of heme catabolism.

heme B
biliverdin
bilirubin

It is the pigment responsible for a greenish colour sometimes seen in bruises.

== Metabolism ==
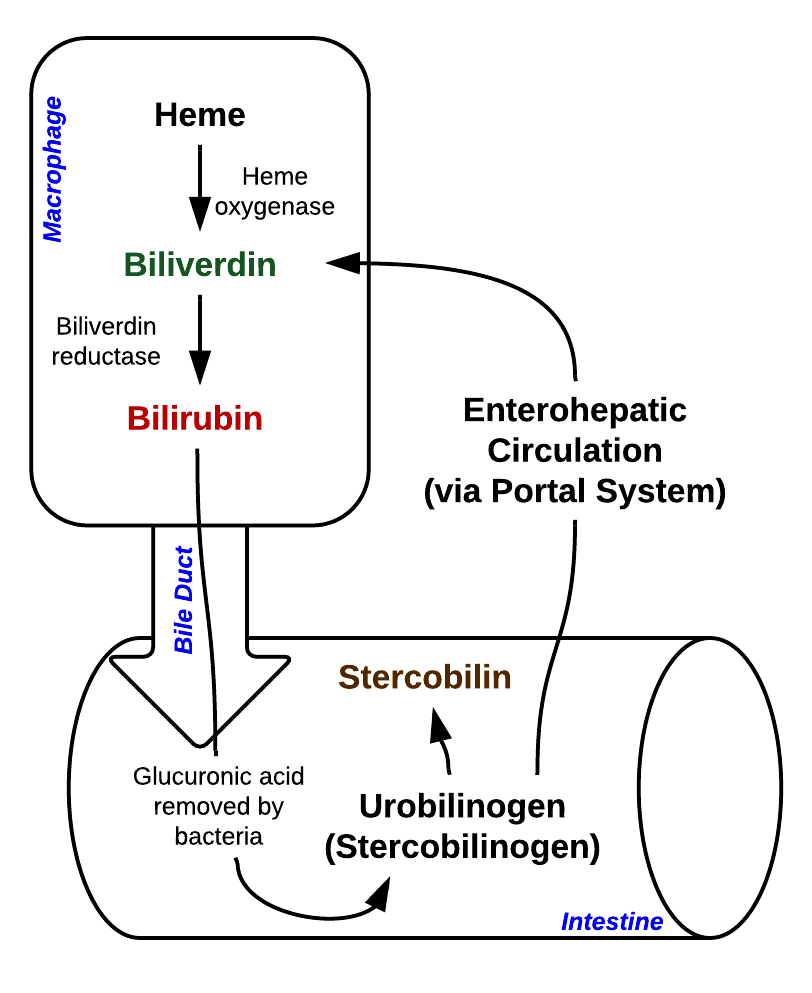
Heme metabolism

Biliverdin results from the breakdown of the heme moiety of hemoglobin in erythrocytes. Macrophages break down senescent erythrocytes and break the heme down into biliverdin along with hemosiderin, in which biliverdin normally rapidly reduces to free bilirubin.

Biliverdin can be observed during the healing process of bruises, being responsible for the green colour of a healing bruise. Its further breakdown into bilirubin leads to the bruise changing to a yellowish colour.

== Role in disease ==
Biliverdin has been found in excess in the blood of humans suffering from hepatic diseases. Jaundice is caused by the accumulation of biliverdin or bilirubin (or both) in the circulatory system and tissues. Jaundiced skin and sclera (whites of the eyes) are characteristic of liver failure.

== Role in treatment of disease ==
While typically regarded as a mere waste product of heme breakdown, evidence has been mounting that suggests that biliverdin – and other bile pigments – has a physiological role in humans.

Bile pigments such as biliverdin possess significant anti-mutagenic and antioxidant properties and therefore, may fulfill a useful physiological function. Biliverdin and bilirubin have been shown to be potent scavengers of hydroperoxyl radicals. They have also been shown to inhibit the effects of polycyclic aromatic hydrocarbons, heterocyclic amines, and oxidants – all of which are mutagens. Some studies have found that people with higher concentration levels of bilirubin and biliverdin in their bodies have a lower frequency of cancer and cardiovascular disease. It has been suggested that biliverdin – as well as many other tetrapyrrolic pigments – may function as an HIV-1 protease inhibitor as well as having beneficial effects in asthma though further research is needed to confirm these results. There are currently no practical implications for using biliverdin in the treatment of any disease.

== In non-human animals ==
Biliverdin is an important pigment component in avian egg shells, especially blue and green shells. Blue egg shells have a significantly higher concentration of biliverdin than brown egg shells. It has also been found in fossil eggs of non-avian dinosaurs.

Research has shown that the biliverdin of egg shells is produced from the shell gland, rather than from the breakdown of erythrocytes in the blood stream, although there is no evidence that the sources of the material are neither tetrapyrroles nor free heme from the blood plasma.

Along with its presence in avian egg shells, other studies have also shown that biliverdin is present in the blue-green blood of many marine fish, the blood of the tobacco hornworm, the wings of moth and butterfly, the serum and eggs of frogs, and the placenta of dogs. With dogs, this can lead, in extremely rare cases, to the birth of puppies with green fur; however, the green color fades out soon after birth. In the garfish (Belone belone) and related species, the bones are bright green because of biliverdin. The green coloration of many grasshoppers and lepidopteran larvae is also due to biliverdin.

Biliverdin is also present in the green blood, muscles, bones, and mucosal lining of skinks of the genus Prasinohaema, found in New Guinea. It is uncertain whether this presence of biliverdin is an ecological or physiological adaptation of any kind. It has been suggested that accumulation of biliverdin might deter harmful infection by Plasmodium malaria parasites, although no statistically significant correlation has been established. The Cambodian frog, Chiromantis samkosensis, also exhibits this characteristic along with turquoise bones.

== In bacteria ==
Biliverdin is the chromophore used in bacteriophytochrome photoreceptor proteins known in various non-photosynthetic bacteria such as Deinococcus radiodurans and Pseudomonas aeruginosa.

== In fluorescence imaging ==
Fluorescent proteins visualize the cell cycle progression. IFP2.0-hGem(1/110) fluorescence is shown in green and highlights the S/G_{2}/M phases. smURFP-hCdtI(30/120) fluorescence is shown in red and highlights the G_{0}/G_{1} phases.

In a complex with reengineered bacterial phytochrome, biliverdin has been employed as an IR-emitting chromophore for in vivo imaging. In contrast to fluorescent proteins which form their chromophore through posttranslational modifications of the polypeptide chain, phytochromes bind an external ligand (in this case, biliverdin), and successful imaging of the first bacteriophytochrome-based probe required addition of the exogenous biliverdin. Recent studies demonstrated that bacteriophytochrome-based fluorescent proteins with high affinity to biliverdin can be imaged in vivo utilizing endogenous ligands only and, thus, with the same ease as the conventional fluorescent proteins. Advent of the second and further generations of the biliverdin-binding bacteriophytochrome-based probes should broaden the possibilities for non-invasive in vivo imaging.

A new class of fluorescent protein was evolved from a cyanobacterial (Trichodesmium erythraeum) phycobiliprotein, α-allophycocyanin, and named small ultra red fluorescent protein (smURFP) in 2016. smURFP autocatalytically self-incorporates the chromophore biliverdin without the need of an external protein, known as a lyase. Jellyfish- and coral-derived fluorescent proteins require oxygen and produce a stoichiometric amount of hydrogen peroxide upon chromophore formation. smURFP does not require oxygen or produce hydrogen peroxide and uses the chromophore biliverdin. smURFP has a large extinction coefficient (180,000 M^{−1} cm^{−1}) and has a modest quantum yield (0.20), which makes it comparable biophysical brightness to eGFP and about 2-fold brighter than most red or far-red fluorescent proteins derived from coral. smURFP spectral properties are similar to the organic dye Cy5.

== See also ==
- Stercobilin
- Tetrapyrrole
- Urobilin
