= Postreplication checkpoint =

A postreplication checkpoint is a DNA damage checkpoint response that provides time for the repair of daughter-strand gaps generated by the eukaryotic replication fork at sites of DNA damage.
