= Shih-Ying Lee =

American engineer and physicist (1918–2018)

Shih-Ying Lee or S. Y. Lee (Chinese: 李詩穎; pinyin: Lǐ Shīyǐng; April 30, 1918 – July 2, 2018) was an American aerodynamicist, businessman, inventor, and mechanical engineer who carried out research and innovation in hydrodynamics-related technologies. He was a professor emeritus at the Massachusetts Institute of Technology.

== Biography ==
Lee was born in 1918 in Beijing, Republic of China into a family of Fuzhou origin. Lee attended Tsinghua University in 1936, and obtained his bachelor's degree in civil engineering in 1940. Upon graduating, Lee worked as a bridge designer and hydraulic power research engineer for the Chinese government for nearly two years, then went to study in the United States in 1942. Lee obtained his Master and PhD in civil engineering at the Massachusetts Institute of Technology in 1943 and 1945.

After graduation, Lee worked for two years at Cram and Ferguson Architects, before returning to MIT as a research engineer. He joined MIT's faculty in 1952 and retired from there in 1974.

In 1985, Lee was elected a member of the United States National Academy of Engineering for his original research on control valve stability, for innovative dynamic measurement instrumentation, and for successful entrepreneurial commercialization of his inventions. Lee was granted many US patents.

Lee founded or co-founded several companies specialized in process control and hydrodynamic instruments. Lee co-founded Dynisco Inc. and Setra Systems Inc. with his brother Y. T. Li, and was chairman of the company. He donated funds to establish the Shih-Ying Lee Scholarship at Tsinghua. He died in July 2018 at the age of 100.
