= Yao-Tzu Li =

American businessman and academic

Yao-Tzu Li or Y. T. Li (Chinese: 李耀滋; pinyin: Lǐ Yàozī; February 1, 1914, Beijing– August 14, 2011) was an American aerodynamicist, businessman, inventor, and mechanical engineer. He was the professor emeritus in aeronautics and astronautics at the Massachusetts Institute of Technology.

== Biography ==
In 1934 Li graduated from the school of engineering at Beiping University (北平大學, (different from today's Peking University in Beijing, even though Beiping is the official name for current Beijing in the Republican era). In 1937 Li graduated from the school of engineering at National Central University (now called Nanjing University) in Nanjing, receiving a bachelor's degree in aeronautical engineering.

During the Second Sino-Japanese War, Li, as chief engineer, established the first airplane factory in China – the Dading Airplane Factory (大定飛機製造廠) in Dading, current Guizhou Province, Southwestern China. Li also led the building of the first Chinese indigenous aircraft engine.

Li participated in the examination for the Boxer Rebellion Indemnity Scholarship Program, and obtained the same score as Qian Xuesen. However, there was only one scholarship awardee and Qian published two or three more articles than Li, so Qian was preferred. Nevertheless, Li went to study in the United States and received master and doctor's degrees from the Massachusetts Institute of Technology. At MIT, Li co-founded the Man-Vehicle Laboratory. Li was also the director of the MIT innovation center. In 1951, Li collaborated with Charles Stark Draper and published an article on optimal control, which opened a new field of automation. Li was promoted to associate professor in 1955.

Li founded several companies including Dynisco, Setra Systems (co-founded with his brother Shih-Ying Lee), and Y.T.Li Engineering. Li is also an inventor and has been granted more than 60 US patents.

In 1987 Li was elected a member of the United States National Academy of Engineering for "his contributions to innovation in instrumentation, control, and to engineering education'". From 1980 to 1984, Li was the President of the Chinese American Association.

Li was an important person involved in the peace dialogue between Beijing and Taipei during the 1970s and 1980s. Li delivered Chiang Ching-kuo's personal messages to Deng Xiaoping when Deng was visiting the United States and Hong Kong. The diplomatic relationship between Beijing and Taipei was dramatically softened during the 1980s.

Li died on August 14, 2011, at the age of 97.

== Publications ==
- Education in Creative Engineering; Y. T. Li (Ed.); July 1970.
- Freedom and Enlightenment: My Life As An Educator/Inventor In China and the United States; by Yao Tzu Li; January 2003.
- Technological Innovation in Education and Industry; by Yao Tzu Li; August 1980.
