= Fluorescent protein =

Fluorescent proteins include:

- Green fluorescent protein (GFP)
- Yellow fluorescent protein (YFP)
- Red fluorescent protein (RFP)
