= Titanophora =

Scientific classification
- Domain: Eukaryota
- Clade: Archaeplastida
- Division: Rhodophyta
- Class: Florideophyceae
- Order: Nemastomatales
- Family: Schizymeniaceae
- Genus: Titanophora (J. Agardh) J. Fledmann

Genus of seeweed

Titanophora is a genus of seaweeds belonging to family Schizymeniaceae of the order Nemastomatales.

== Taxonomy and nomenclature ==
It composes of eight taxonomically accepted species based from available data and literature.

=== Species ===
- Titanophora calcarea (Okamura) Børgesen, 1949
- Titanophora incrustans (J.Agardh) Børgesen, 1949
- Titanophora marianensis Itono & Tsuda, 1980
- Titanophora mauritiana Børgesen, 1949
- Titanophora palmata Itono, 1972
- Titanophora pikeana (Dickie) Feldmann, 1942
- Titanophora submarina K.E.Bucher & J.N.Norris, 1992
- Titanophora weberae Børgesen, 1943

== Description ==
The thalli are slimy and formed by calcium carbonate specifically at the medulla. They exhibit colorations ranging from pinkish to red and commonly seen attached to solid substrate (rocky surface) by small disc-like holdfast. The blade can be palmate and flabellate, with the main axis provided with simple mottling or branched outgrowths on the surface. Branching is irregular, and ultimate branchlets exhibits flat, fine, papillose to spinose morphologies.

Under a microscope, the cross-section of the blade shows four to five layers of pigmented cells located at the cortex: the outermost cells are elongate, while the innermost are roundish in shape. The cortex also possess gland cells. The medulla is composed of cylindrical unpigmented filaments.

== Reproduction ==
Presence of cystocarps which displays a carpogonial branch system, were mainly found at the uncalcified region of the cortex.

== Distribution and ecology ==
The genus Titanophora are distributed throughout the tropical to subtropical regions. They are usually found inhabiting rocky intertidal areas that are exposed to strong water movements near the reef margin or channels to subtidal areas as deep as 12 m (39 ft).

== Life history ==
The life history of the genus Titanophora is currently unknown. However, it may share similar reproductive patterns with other members of the family Schizymeniaceae which is characterized by a combination of vegetative and reproductive features: filaments connecting and arising directly from carpogonia; medulla producing X-shaped cells; gland cell started to disappear; supporting and auxiliary cells forming in an intercalary position on cortical fascicles; carpogonial branches producing sterile or fertile lateral branchlets; connecting filament branches fuse with an auxiliary cell; special nutritive cells are absent. Furthermore, the genus may also share similar reproductive patters with other members of Rhodophyta, such as the presence of filamentous tetrasporophyte.

== Economic use/natural products ==
The natural products that can be found in Titanophora, particularly in T. weberae are the following"

- iodine (I)
- carotene
- chlorophyll a
- chlorophyll d
- lutein
- r-phycocyanin
- r-phycoerythrin
- zeaxanthin
- floridean starch
- funoran
- furcellarin
- galactan
- chalinasterol
- cholesterol
- fucosterol
- sitosterol.

Application of these natural products can be in the medicinal field, particularly for the reduction of blood cholesterol levels.
