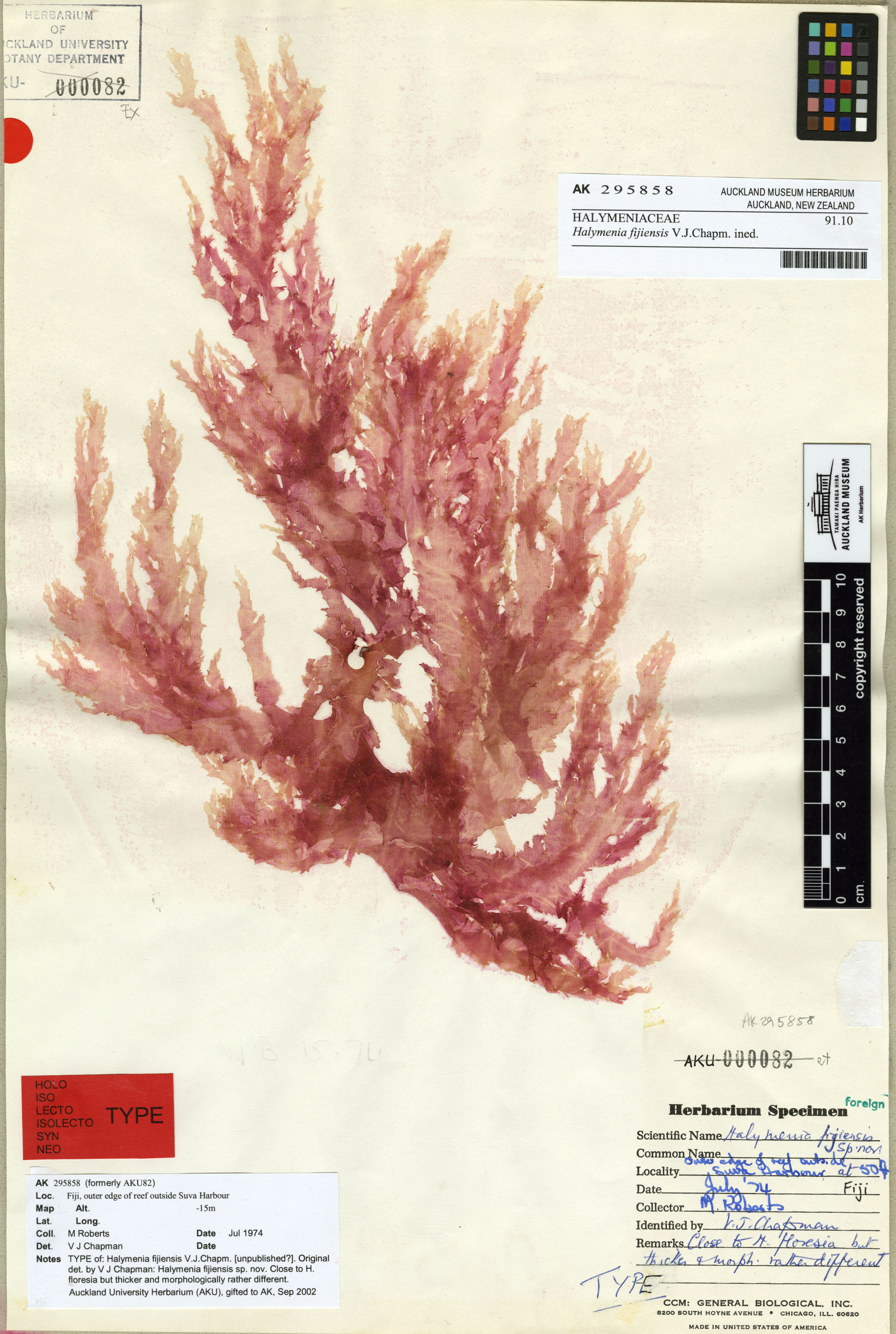
- Halymenia fijiensis

Scientific classification
- Domain: Eukaryota
- Clade: Archaeplastida
- Division: Rhodophyta
- Class: Florideophyceae
- Subclass: Rhodymeniophycidae
- Order: Halymeniales; G.W. Saunders & Kraft, 1996

Synonyms
- Cryptonemiales G.Murray, Introd. Stud. Seaweeds: 206, 238. 1895 (“Cryptonemiaceae”); Cryptonemiineae Farlow Rept. US Fish. Comm. 7: 140. 1881 (“Cryptonemieae”), pro subord.

= Halymeniales =

Order of algae

Halymeniales is an order of red algae belonging to the class Florideophyceae and the subclass Rhodymeniophycidae.

The type species is Halymenia C.Agardh.

The red algae colour comes from photosynthetic pigments (phycoerythrin, phycocyanin, allophycocyanin). Then the various blends of relative amounts of these 3 and chlorophyll, influences the plant colour, which can vary from dark red to blue, brown, or greenish.

== History ==
In 1996, Saunders and Kraft recognized a new name, the Halymeniales, for the red algal order that was previously known as the Cryptonemiales Kylin, based on small-subunit rRNA phylogenetic analyses. The adapted order of Halymeniales originally held the families of Halymeniaceae Bory and Sebdeniaceae Kylin, and it was characterized by taxa with a multi-axial thallus, non-procarpic female reproductive development, outwardly directed carpogonial branches and intercalary auxiliary cells (Saunders and Kraft, 1996). Later Saunders and Kraft in 2002, transferred the genus Tsengia K. C. Fan and Y. C. Fan from the Nemastomatales order into the Halymeniales with the establishment of the new mono-generic family Tsengiaceae. The Sebdeniaceae family was later removed from the Halymeniales and elevated to a new order, Sebdeniales Withall and Saunders (by Withall and Saunders, 2006) as suggested by Gavio et al. (2005). Later, Papenfuss (1955) synonymized the Grateloupiaceae with the Cryptonemiaceae; however, Guiry (1978) reinstated the Halymeniaceae Bory based on nomenclatural priority. As a consequence, the Grateloupiaceae and Cryptonemiaceae are now considered synonyms of the Halymeniaceae. After using a taxon-rich rbcL data set, the family Grateloupiaceae was reinstated into the Halymeniales order in 2021. The Archaeolithophyllaceae Chuvashov family was created in 1987, and placed within the Corallinales (Order), before being placed within the Halymeniales.

== Families ==
The following families are recognised in the order Halymeniales:

- †Archaeolithophyllaceae Tchuvashov
- Grateloupiaceae Schmitz
- Halymeniaceae Bory
- Tsengiaceae G.W.Saunders & Kraft

== Distribution ==
The order has cosmopolitan distribution. They are found in places such as Tasmania (Australia), Brazil, within the Mediterranean, near the island of Madagascar (within the Indian Ocean), the Philippines, Vietnam, the South Korean coast (East and South) and near Japan.

== Species notes ==
Polyopes affinis is a red alga from the order Halymeniales. The species is abundantly found along the South Korean coast (East and South) and also in Japan, and it is widely used as a food in South Korea, Japan, and China because of its nutritional properties and health benefits (Ha et al. 2022).

Also, Halymenia durvillei is a red seaweed with a great potential as sulphated galactan producer.
