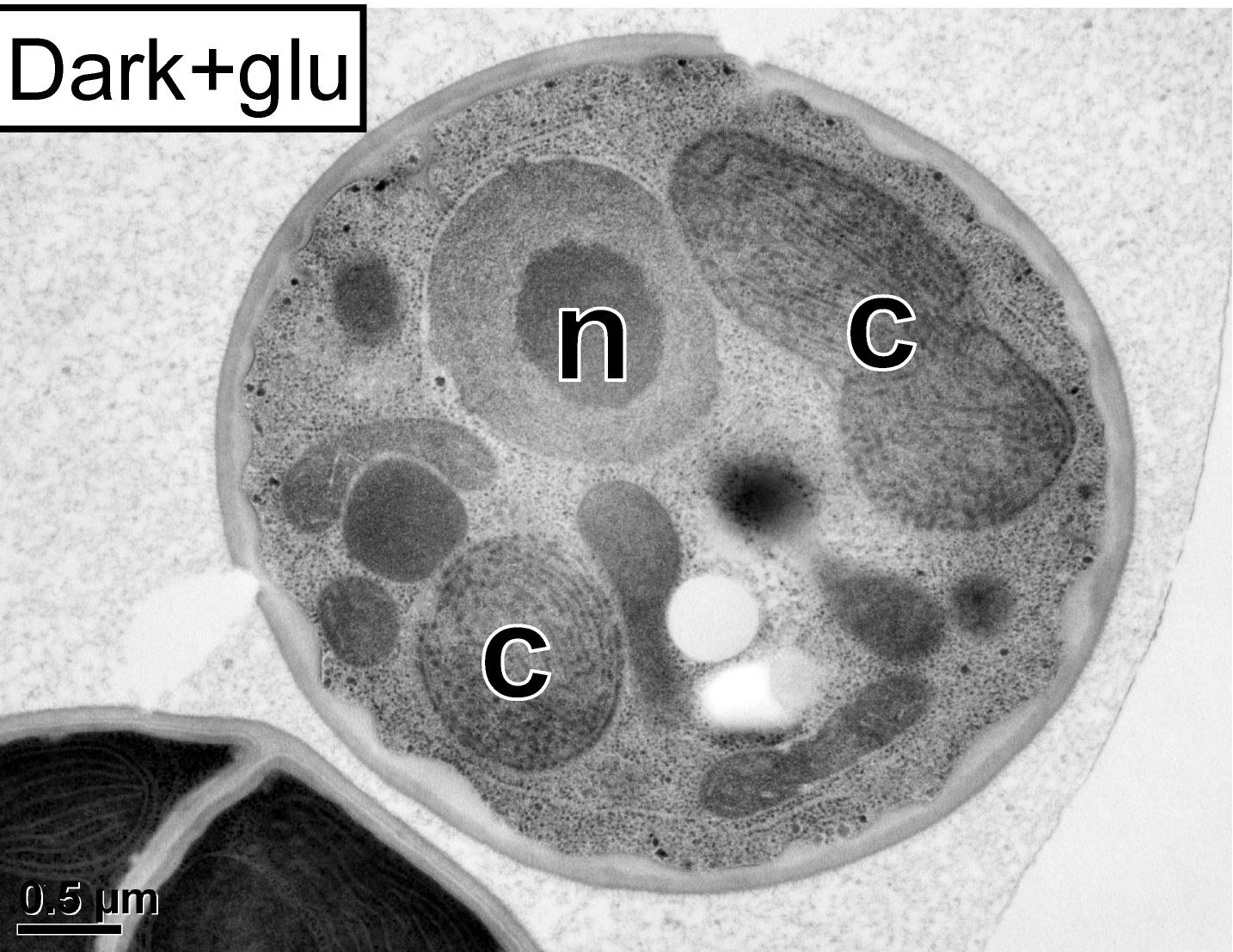
- Galdieria partita cell. n: nucleus; c: chloroplast

Scientific classification
- Domain: Eukaryota
- Supergroup: Archaeplastida
- Division: Rhodophyta
- Class: Cyanidiophyceae
- Order: Cyanidiales
- Family: Galdieriaceae
- Genus: Galdieria
- Species: G. partita

Binomial name
- Galdieria partita O.Yu.Sentsova, 1991

= Galdieria partita =

Species of red algae

Galdieria partita is a species of extremophilic red algae that lives in acidic hot springs. It is the only unicellular species of red algae known to reproduce sexually. It was discovered in 1894 by Josephine Elizabeth Tilden from Yellowstone National Park in the western United States. Originally described as a species of green algae, Chroococcus varium, its scientific name and taxonomic position were revised several times. In 1959, Mary Belle Allen produced the pure culture which has been distributed as the "Allen strain".

== History ==
Josephine Elizabeth Tilden, the first woman teacher at the University of Minnesota, investigated algae of the Yellowstone National Park in Wyoming in 1894. Among her collection was a species which she identified as a green alga. In 1898, she named it Protococcus botryoides f. caldarium. Austrian biologists Lothar Geitler and Franz Ruttner revised the identification as a blue-green algae with a name Cyanidium caldarium in 1936. Around the same time Joseph J. Copeland created the genus name as Pluto caldarius. The controversy of priority started, but Cyanidium caldarium became more widely used.

Mary Belle Allen, while working at the Marine Station of Stanford University, had developed the method of culturing microbes living at high temperature (thermophiles). In 1952, she developed a specific culture media for thermophilic algae by which she isolated an "unidentified unicellular alga" from the acid waters of the Lemonade Spring, The Geysers, Sonoma County, California. In 1958, while working at the Laboratory of Comparative Physiology and Morphology of the Kaiser Foundation Research Institute in Richmond, California, she compared the thermophilic algae of the Lemonade Spring with those of the Yellowstone National Park. With it she produced the first pure culture of the C. caldarium, as reported in 1959. This sample was subsequently distributed as the "Allen strain".

In 1991, Olga Yu Sentsova at the Moscow State University, analysed the specimen of Allan strain with a new one collected from Kamchatka Peninsula in Russia Far East. She confirmed that the specimens were distinct from other C. caldarium and revised the identification as Galdieria partita, along with a description of two other new species, G. daedala and G. maxima. The genus Galdieria was established by an Italian botanist Aldo Merola in 1981 for the identification of a red alga, G. sulphuraria.

== Habitat ==
G. partita is an thermoacidophile that survives well in high temperature and high acidic environments. They are present in hot springs of the Yellowstone National Park in US, Kamchatka Peninsula in Russia Far East, and the Tatun Volcanic Group area in Taiwan. The hot springs of the Yellowstone National Park has high acidity with a pH ranging from 2.5 to 3, and a temperature ranging from 28 to 90 °C. The Kamchatka hot springs can have a pH as low as 1.5 and temperatures from 50 to 99 °C.

== Structure and composition ==
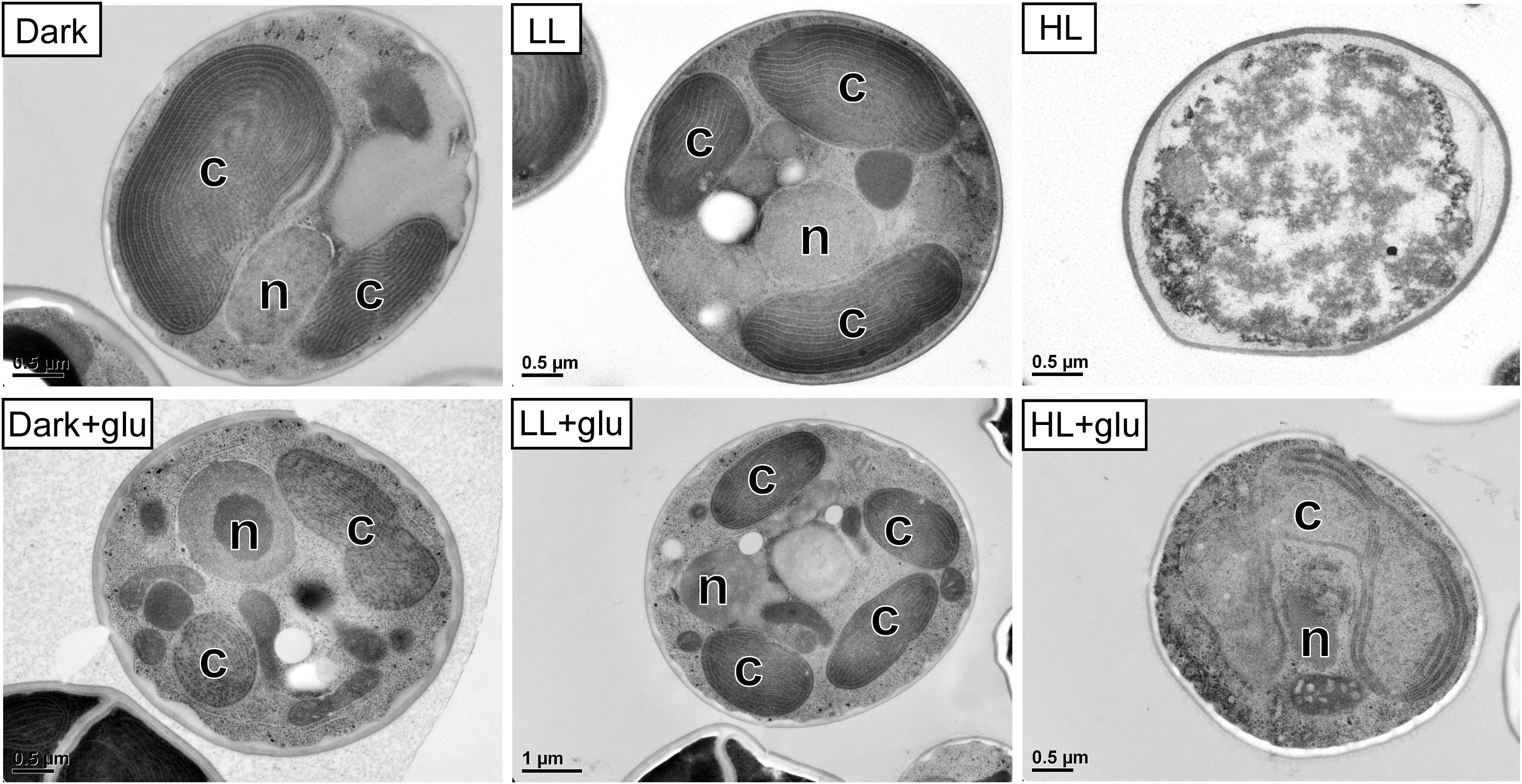
Galdieria partita cells under various growth conditions. c: chloroplast; glu: glucose; HL: high light source; LL: low light source; n: nucleus.

G. partita is unicellular, and alter between diploid cells with a cell wall and haploid cells without a cell wall. It is spherical in shape and measures 2.5 to 8 μm in diameter. The Allen strain is slightly bigger under culture as it can grow to 10 to 11 μm in size. There is single mitochondrion with a crescent shape, and a single vacuole. It contains prominent nucleus and the rest of the cytoplasm is much occupied by a single chloroplast. The chloroplast is belt-shaped in young individuals and becomes four-lobed in mature cells.

It is for the prominent presence of chloroplast that it was once argued to be member of the green algae and blue-green algae. It requires light to produce chlorophyll and phycocyanin, while green algae and blue-green algae do not. It was difficult to recognise as a red alga because of the presence of a purple pigment phycocyanin, as red algae are normally characterised by phycobilins (phycocyanobilin, phycoerythrobilin, phycourobilin and phycobiliviolin), pigments that give the distinctive red or orange colour.

=== Biochemistry ===
G. partita is a facultative heterotroph that feeds on various nutrients mostly under low light environment, but can grow well in under sunlight, unlike other Galdieria species. It mostly uses citric acid as its nutrient source for carbon and energy. Environmental glucose level facilitates protection from oxidative stress by stimulating the biosynthesis of ascorbic acid.

== Reproduction ==
Asexual reproduction is achieved by spore (endospore) formation. The mother cell divides internally and the daughter cells are released after rupture of the mother cell wall. The chloroplast divides first and then the nucleus afterwards. The daughter cells are called autospores and divide into cell numbers 2 to 4 to 8.
