= Inositol 2-dehydrogenase =

inositol 2-dehydrogenase

Identifiers
- EC no.: 1.1.1.18
- CAS no.: 9028-25-5

Databases
- BRENDA: enzyme data
- ExPASy: NiceZyme view
- KEGG: enzyme entry
- MetaCyc: metabolic pathway
- Rhea: reactions
- PDB structures: RCSB PDB PDBe PDBsum
- Gene Ontology: AmiGO / QuickGO
Search
- PMC: articles
- PubMed: articles
- NCBI: proteins

Inositol 2-dehydrogenases (EC 1.1.1.18) are a type of enzyme that are found in bacteria and red algae (galdieria sulphuraria) that catalyze the chemical reaction

myo-inositol
+ NAD^{+}
H^{+}
H^{+}
2,4,6/3,5-pentahydroxycyclohexanone
+ NADH

The two substrates of this enzyme are myo-inositol and oxidised nicotinamide adenine dinucleotide (NAD^{+}). Its products are 2,4,6/3,5-pentahydroxycyclohexanone, reduced NADH, and a proton.

This enzyme belongs to the family of oxidoreductases, specifically those acting on the CH-OH group of donor with NAD^{+} or NADP^{+} as acceptor. The systematic name of this enzyme class is myo-inositol:NAD^{+} 2-oxidoreductase. Other names in common use include myo-inositol 2-dehydrogenase, myo-inositol:NAD^{+} oxidoreductase, inositol dehydrogenase, and myo-inositol dehydrogenase. This enzyme participates in inositol metabolism and inositol phosphate metabolism.
