= Yariv =

Yariv is a Jewish given name and surname. Notable people with the name include:

== Given name ==
- Yariv Levin (born 1969), Israeli lawyer and politician
- Yariv Mozer, (1978), Israeli film producer, screenwriter and film director
- Yariv Oppenheimer, far-left Israeli activist and politician

== Surname ==
- Aharon Yariv (1920–1994), Israeli politician and general
- Amnon Yariv (born 1930), Israeli-American scientist
- Joseph Yariv (1927–2021), Israeli biochemist, the namesake of Yariv reagent
- Leeat Yariv, American professor in economics
