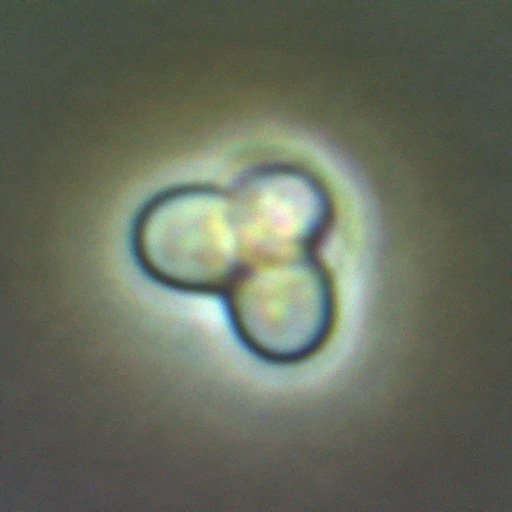

Scientific classification
- Domain: Eukaryota
- Supergroup: Archaeplastida
- Division: Rhodophyta
- Class: Cyanidiophyceae
- Order: Cyanidiales
- Family: Cyanidiaceae
- Genus: Cyanidioschyzon
- Species: C. merolae

Binomial name
- Cyanidioschyzon merolae P.De Luca, R.Taddei & L.Varano, 1978

= Cyanidioschyzon =

Species of alga

Cyanidioschyzon merolae is a small (2μm), club-shaped, unicellular haploid red alga adapted to high sulfur acidic hot spring environments (pH 1.5, 45 °C). The cellular architecture of C. merolae is extremely simple, containing only a single chloroplast and a single mitochondrion and lacking a vacuole and cell wall. In addition, the cellular and organelle divisions can be synchronized. For these reasons, C. merolae is considered an excellent model system for study of cellular and organelle division processes, as well as biochemistry and structural biology. The organism's genome was the first full algal genome to be sequenced in 2004; its plastid was sequenced in 2000 and 2003, and its mitochondrion in 1998. The organism has been considered the simplest of eukaryotic cells for its minimalist cellular organization.

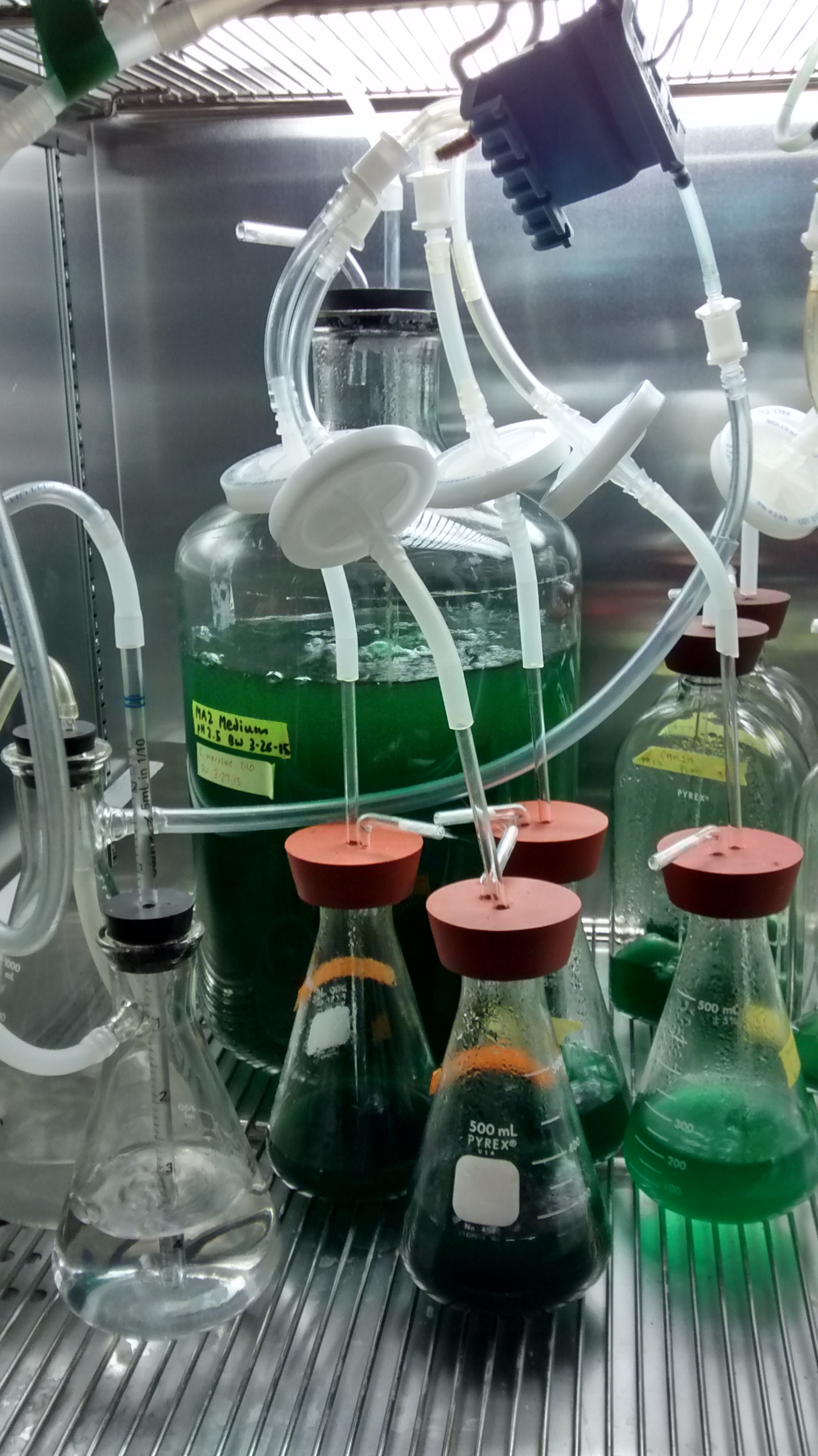
Growing the red alga C. merolae in flasks and a 10-litre (2.2 imp gal; 2.6 US gal) carboy. Although classified as a red alga, C. merolae is blue-green: it makes little if any of the red pigment phycoerythrin, and hence only displays the second red-algal pigment, phycocyanin, and the green pigment chlorophyll.

== Isolation and growth in culture ==
Originally isolated by De Luca in 1978 from the solfatane fumaroles of Campi Flegrei (Naples, Italy), C. merolae can be grown in culture in the laboratory in Modified Allen's medium (MA) or a modified form with twice the concentration of some elements called MA2. In MA medium, growth rates are relatively slow, with a doubling time (the time it takes a culture of microbes to double in cells per unit volume) of approximately 32 hours. In the more effective medium MA2, this can be reduced to 24 hours. Culturing is done at 42 °C (108 °F) under white fluorescent light with an approximate intensity of 50 μmol photons m^{−2} s^{−1} (μE). However, under a higher light intensity of 90 μE with 5% CO_{2} applied through bubbling, the growth rate of C. merolae can be further increased, with a doubling time of approximately 9.2 hours. Higher light is not necessarily beneficial, as above 90 μE the growth rate begins to decrease. This may be due to photodamage occurring to the photosynthetic apparatus. C. merolae can also be grown on gellan gum plates for purposes of colony selection or strain maintenance in the laboratory. C. merolae is an obligate oxygenic phototroph, meaning it is not capable of taking up fixed carbon from its environment and must rely on oxygenic photosynthesis to fix carbon from CO_{2}.

== Genome ==
The 16.5 megabase pair genome of C. merolae was sequenced in 2004. The reduced, extremely simple, compact genome is made up of 20 chromosomes and was found to contain 5,331 genes, of which 86.3% were found to be expressed and only 26 contain introns, which contained strict consensus sequences. Strikingly, the genome of C. merolae contains only 30 tRNA genes and an extremely minimal number of ribosomal RNA gene copies, as shown in the genome comparison table. The reduced nature of the genome has led to several other unusual features. While most eukaryotes contain 10 or so copies of the dynamins required for pinching membranes to separate dividing compartments, C. merolae only contains two, a fact that researchers have taken advantage of when studying organelle division.

Although possessing a small genome, the chloroplast genome of C. merolae contains many genes not present in the chloroplast genomes of other algae and plants. Most of its genes are intronless.

== Molecular biology ==
As is the case with most model organisms, genetic tools have been developed in C. merolae. These include methods for the isolation of DNA and RNA from C. merolae, the introduction of DNA into C. merolae for transient or stable transformation, and methods for selection including a uracil auxotroph that can be used as a selection marker.

=== DNA isolation ===
Several methods, derived from cyanobacterial protocols, are used for the isolation of DNA from C. merolae. The first is a hot phenol extraction, which is a quick extraction that can be used to isolate DNA suitable for DNA amplification polymerase chain reaction (PCR), wherein phenol is added to whole cells and incubated at 65 °C to extract DNA. If purer DNA is required, the Cetyl trimethyl ammonium bromide (CTAB) method may be employed. In this method, a high-salt extraction buffer is first applied and cells are disrupted, after which a chloroform-phenol mixture is used to extract the DNA at room temperature.

=== RNA isolation ===
Total RNA may be extracted from C. merolae cells using a variant of the hot phenol method described above for DNA.

=== Protein extraction ===
As is the case for DNA and RNA, the protocol for protein extraction is also an adaptation of the protocol used in cyanobacteria. Cells are disrupted using glass beads and vortexing in a 10% glycerol buffer containing the reducing agent DTT to break disulfide bonds within proteins. This extraction will result in denatured proteins, which can be used in SDS-PAGE gels for Western blotting and Coomassie staining.

=== Transformant selection and uracil auxotrophic line ===
C. merolae is sensitive to many antibiotics commonly used for selection of successfully transformed individuals in the laboratory, but it resistant to some, notably ampicillin and kanamycin.

A commonly used selection marker for transformation in C. merolae involves a uracil auxotroph (requiring exogenous uracil). The mutant was developed by growing C. merolae in the presence of a compound, 5-FOA, which in and of itself is non-toxic but is converted to the toxic compound 5-Fluorouracil by an enzyme in the uracil biosynthetic pathway, orotidine 5'-monophosphate (OMP) decarboxylase, encoded by the Ura5.3 gene. Random mutation led to several loss-of-function mutants in Ura5.3, which allowed cells to survive in the presence of 5-FOA as long as uracil was provided. By transforming this mutant with a PCR fragment carrying both a gene of interest and a functional copy of Ura5.3, researchers can confirm that the gene of interest has been incorporated into the C. merolae genome if it can grow without exogenous uracil.

=== Polyethylene glycol (PEG) mediated transient expression ===
While chromosomal integration of genes creates a stable transformant, transient expression allows short-term experiments to be done using labeled or modified genes in C. merolae. Transient expression can be achieved using a polyethylene glycol (PEG) based method in protoplasts (plant cells with the rigid cell wall enzymatically eliminated), and because C. merolae lacks a cell wall, it behaves much as a protoplast would for transformation purposes. To transform, cells are briefly exposed to 30% PEG with the DNA of interest, resulting in transient transformation. In this method, the DNA is taken up as a circular element and is not integrated into the genome of the organism because no homologous regions exist for integration.

=== Gene targeting ===
To create a stable mutant line, gene targeting can be used to insert a gene of interest into a particular location of the C. merolae genome via homologous recombination. By including regions of DNA several hundred base pairs long on the ends of the gene of interest that are complementary to a sequence within the C. merolae genome, the organism's own DNA repair machinery can be used to insert the gene at these regions. The same transformation procedure as is used for transient expression can be used here, except with the homologous DNA segments to allow for genome integration.

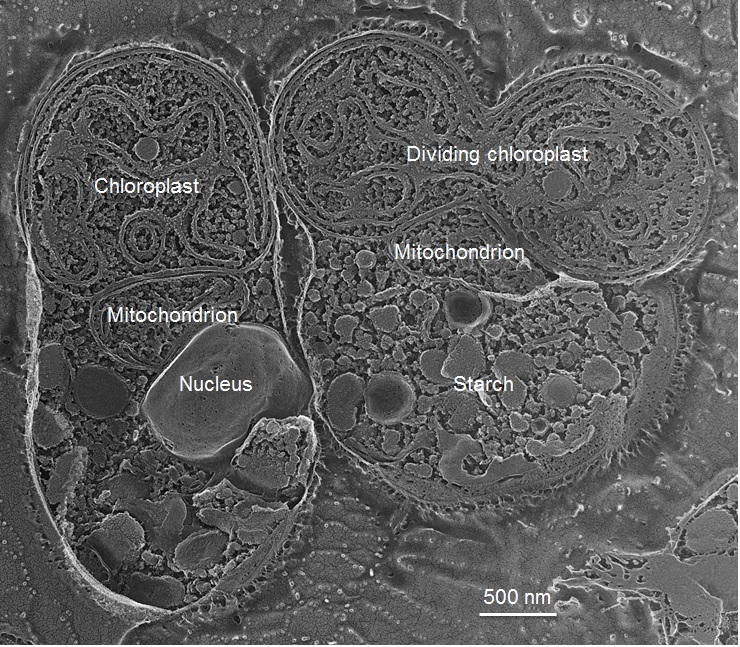
Freeze fracture deep etch electron microscopy image of C. merolae, showing two cells, one in which the plastid has begun to divide. Courtesy of Prof. Ursula Goodenough.

== Studying cell and organelle divisions ==
The extremely simple divisome, simple cell architecture, and ability to synchronize divisions in C. merolae makes it the perfect organism for studying mechanisms of eukaryotic cell and organelle division. Synchronization of the division of organelles in cultured cells can be very simple and usually involves the use of light and dark cycles. The chemical agent aphidicolin can be added to easily and effectively synchronize chloroplast division. The peroxisome division mechanism was first ascertained using C. merolae as a system, where peroxisome division can be synchronized using the microtubule-disrupting drug oryzalin in addition to light-dark cycles.

== Photosynthesis research ==
C. merolae is also used in researching photosynthesis. Notably, the subunit composition of the photosystems in C. merolae has some significant differences from that of other related organisms. Photosystem II (PSII) of C. merolae, as might be expected, has a particularly unusual pH range in which it can function. Despite the fact that the mechanism of PSII requires protons to be quickly released, and lower pH solutions should alter the ability to do this, C. merolae PSII is capable of exchanging and splitting water at the same rate as other related species.

== See also ==
- Galdieria sulphuraria
- Red algae
