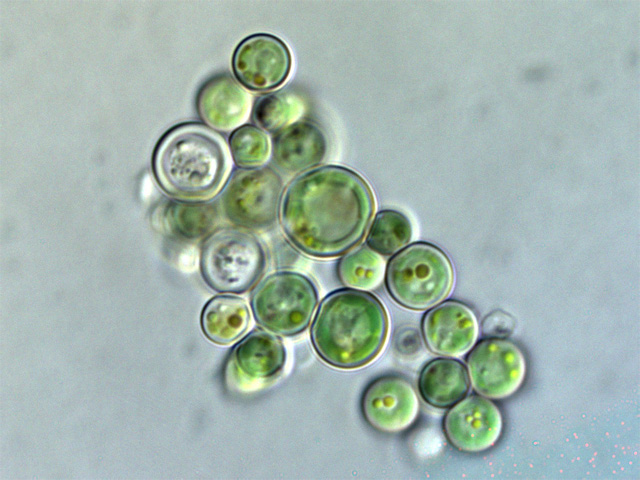
- Cyanidium sp.

Scientific classification
- Clade: Archaeplastida
- Division: Rhodophyta
- Class: Cyanidiophyceae
- Order: Cyanidiales
- Family: Cyanidiaceae; Geitler, 1933

Genera
- Cyanidioschyzon P.De Luca, R.Taddei & L.Varano, 1978; Cyanidium Geitler, 1933; Pluto J.J.Copeland, 1936; Rhodococcus A.Hansgirg, 1884

= Cyanidiaceae =

Family of algae

Cyanidiaceae is a family of red algae, one of two families in the Division Cyanidiophytina.
