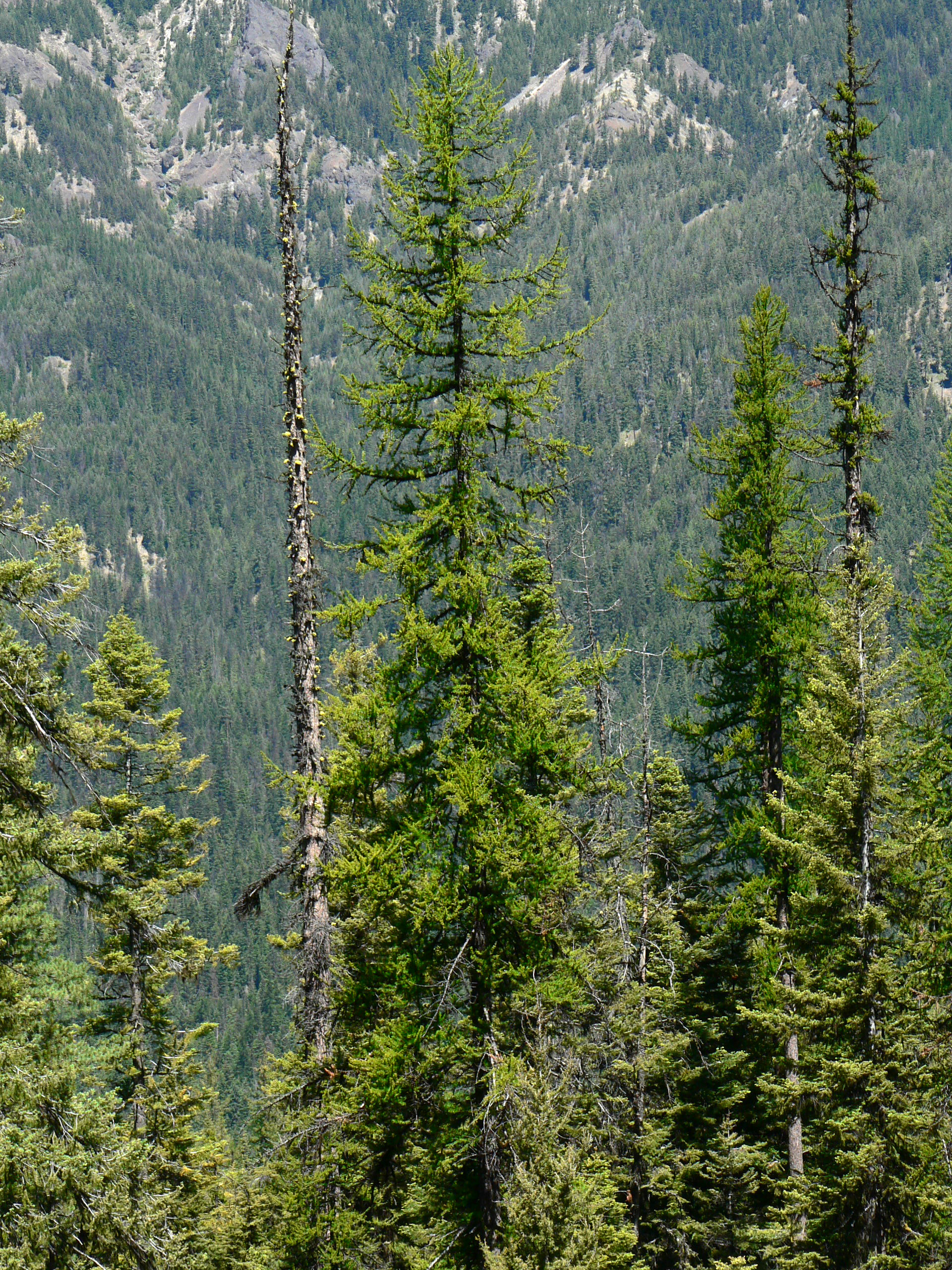
- William O. Douglas Wilderness; Naches Valley, WA

Conservation status
- Least Concern (IUCN 3.1)

- Secure (NatureServe)

Scientific classification
- Kingdom: Plantae
- Clade: Embryophytes
- Clade: Tracheophytes
- Clade: Gymnosperms
- Division: Pinophyta
- Class: Pinopsida
- Order: Pinales
- Family: Pinaceae
- Genus: Larix
- Species: L. occidentalis

Binomial name
- Larix occidentalis Nutt.
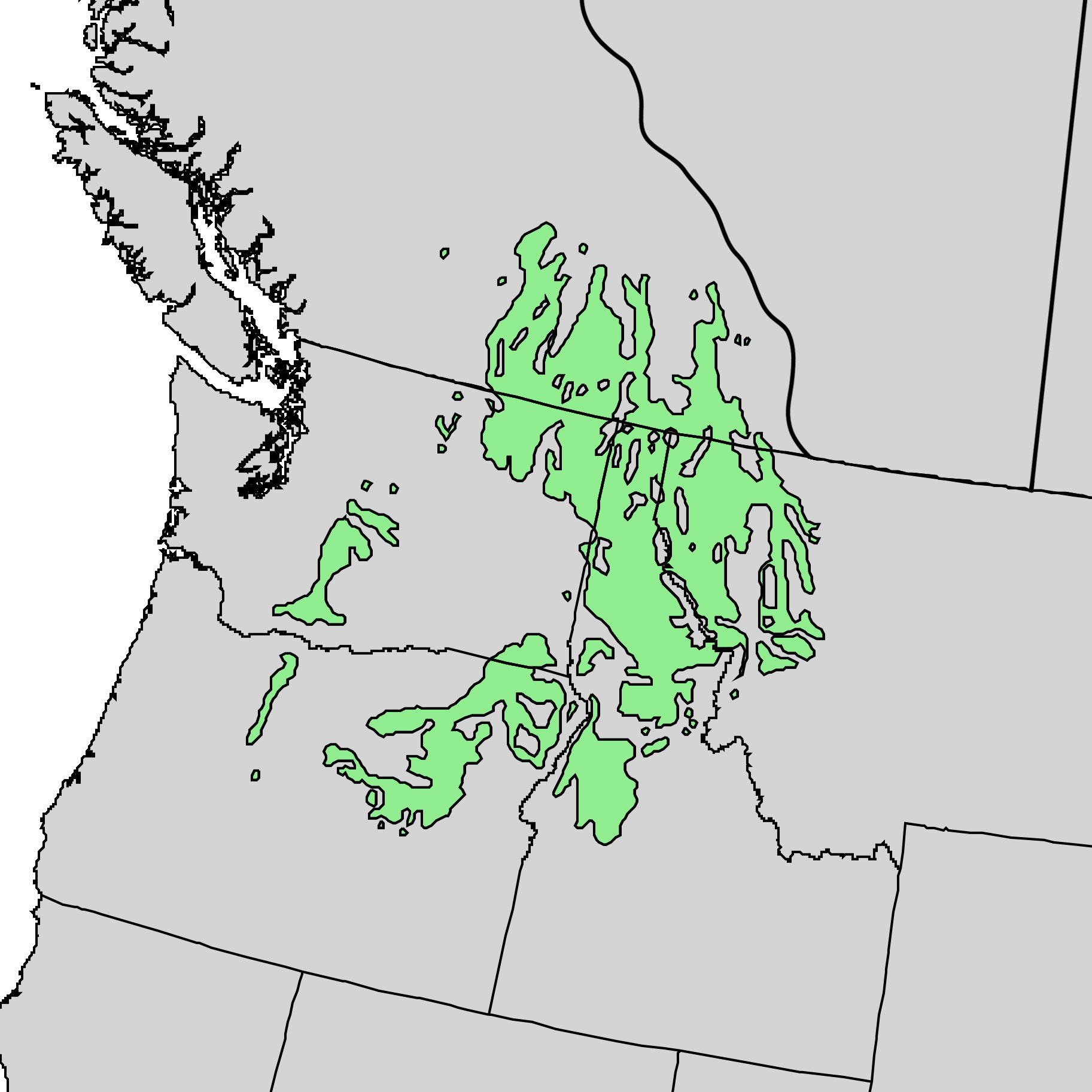
- Natural range of Larix occidentalis

= Western larch =

Species of conifer

The western larch (Larix occidentalis) is a species of larch native to the mountains of western North America (Pacific Northwest, Inland Northwest); in Canada in southeastern British Columbia and southwestern Alberta, and in the United States in eastern Washington, eastern Oregon, northern Idaho, and western Montana. It is the most productive of the three species of larch native to North America.

== Description ==
The tree is a large deciduous conifer reaching 30 to 60 meters (98 to 197 feet) tall, with a trunk up to 1.5 m (4 ft 11 in) diameter; the bark ranges from orangish to purplish brown. The crown is narrow conic; the main branches are level to upswept, with the side branches often drooping. The shoots are dimorphic, with growth divided into long shoots (typically 10 to 50 centimeters (4 to 20 in) long) and bearing several buds, and short shoots only 1 to 2 millimeters (1/32 to 3/32 in) long with only a single bud. The leaves are needle-like, light green, 2 to 5 cm (3/4 to 2 in) long, soft and very slender; they turn bright yellow in the fall, leaving the pale orange-brown shoots bare until the next spring.

The seed cones are ovoid-cylindric, 2 to 5 cm (3/4 to 2 in) long, with 40 to 80 seed scales; each scale bearing an exserted 4 to 8 mm (3/16 to 5/16 in) bract. The cones are green to reddish purple when immature, turning brown and the scales opening flat or reflexed to release the seeds when mature, four to six months after pollination. The old cones commonly remain on the tree for many years, turning dull gray-black.

Individual specimens can live centuries, even up to a millennium. The largest known specimen is about 1,000 years old, 50 m (160 ft) tall and over 2 m (7 ft) in diameter with a 10 m (34 ft) crown, located at Seeley Lake, Montana.

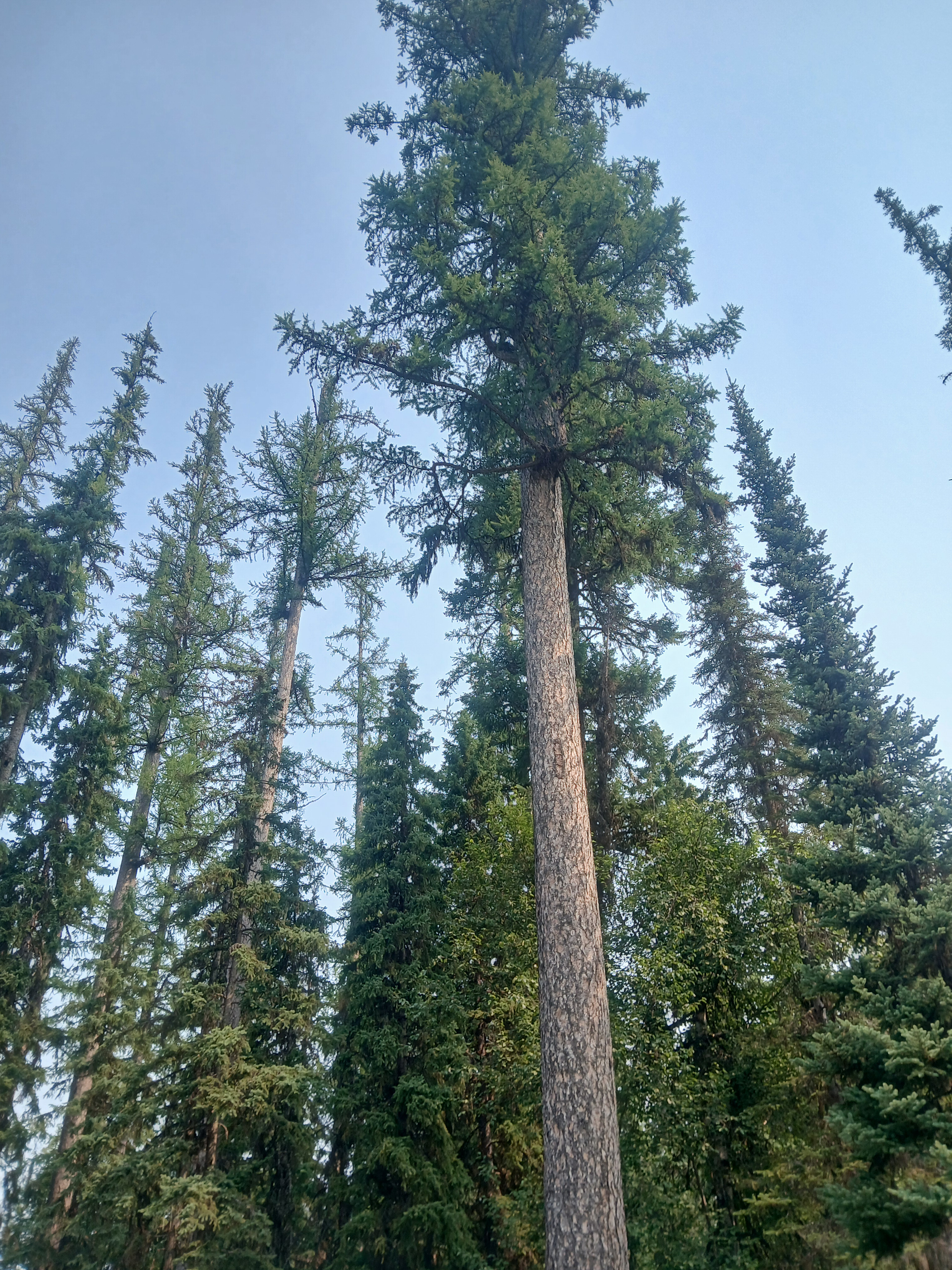
Western Larch

== Distribution ==
Western larch grows almost exclusively in the drainage of the Columbia River, from the east of the Cascade Range to the west of the Continental Divide. It covers the regions from around Kamloops, British Columbia, to Weiser, Idaho, and Central Oregon. It appears on ranges including the Blue Mountains and others in southeast BC and northwest Montana, usually on moist slopes up to 1,800 m (5,900 ft) above sea level. It can grow from elevations between 500 and 2,400 m (1,600 and 7,900 ft) and is very cold tolerant, able to survive winter temperatures down to about −50 °C (−58 °F). It only grows on well-drained soils, unable to thrive on waterlogged ground.

== Ecology ==
Western larch grows more quickly than many associated trees, as it needs to because larch is shade intolerant. With its thick bark, nonflammable foliage and protective cones, the species is very fire resistant. In the late 20th century, after wildfires had been suppressed for almost a century, larches at Seeley Lake and Glacier National Park were endangered by major fires enabled by fuel ladder; normally smaller fires would have depleted the fuel. In more recent years, many smaller fires have been allowed to take their course.

Grouse browse the tree's leaves and buds. The seeds are an important substitute winter food for some birds, notably the pine siskin but also the redpoll, and white-winged crossbill. This is frequently during times when other conifer cones that are a more preferred diet are in short supply. Woodpeckers utilize the heart rot of older specimens to make openings, which are used by various small animals.

=== Assisted migration ===
In 2010, the Government of British Columbia implemented an assisted migration program of western larch to a new habitat in northern British Columbia, about 1000 kilometers north of its current range. Assisted migration of Canadian forests had been proposed as an adaptation measure in response to climate change. Indeed, as average temperatures rise, the optimal climate conditions for trees species are also moving north. Research had shown that western larch trees have no trouble growing in northern BC, an area whose climatic conditions are predicted to match the western larch's historical range by 2030.

British Columbia started seeding western larch trees in northern BC in the early 2010s. This was the first assisted migration program for a North American tree. The western larch was selected for because of its significant commercial importance and the fear that climate change and parasites such as the mountain pine beetle would considerably diminish its supply. To pre-empt opposition from biologists and other groups, the government avoided making public consultation on the program. Instead, they framed the policy as an introduction of a non-exotic species to a similar environment and implemented the program through the province's existing legal and regulatory framework.

Foresters in the United States have also initiated "experimental treatments" of larch-dominated national forests in Montana. However, if some "aggressively warming climate scenarios" actually unfold, foresters will need to let go of any expectations of helping this species maintain a presence south of the Canadian border.

== Uses ==
Indigenous peoples applied the resinous gum to injuries and chewed it to treat sore throat. Some also ate the cambium and sap; the Kutenai and Bitterroot Salish of Montana in particular collected the sap. A medicinal tea was made from the bark or foliage. Some Plateau Indian tribes drank an infusion from the young shoots to treat tuberculosis and laryngitis.

The sweetish galactan of the sap can be made into baking powder and medicine. An extract of the tree is sold as a health supplement. The water-soluble arabinogalactan is used in food, medicine, ink, and paint.

The wood is tough and durable, but also flexible in thin strips, and is particularly valued for yacht building; wood used for this must be free of knots, and can only be obtained from old trees that were pruned when young to remove side branches. Small larch poles are widely used for rustic fencing. The wood is highly prized as firewood in the Pacific Northwest where it is often called "tamarack", although it is a different species than the tamarack larch. The wood burns with a sweet fragrance and a distinctive popping noise.

Western larch is used for the production of Venice turpentine.

== Gallery ==
Western larch
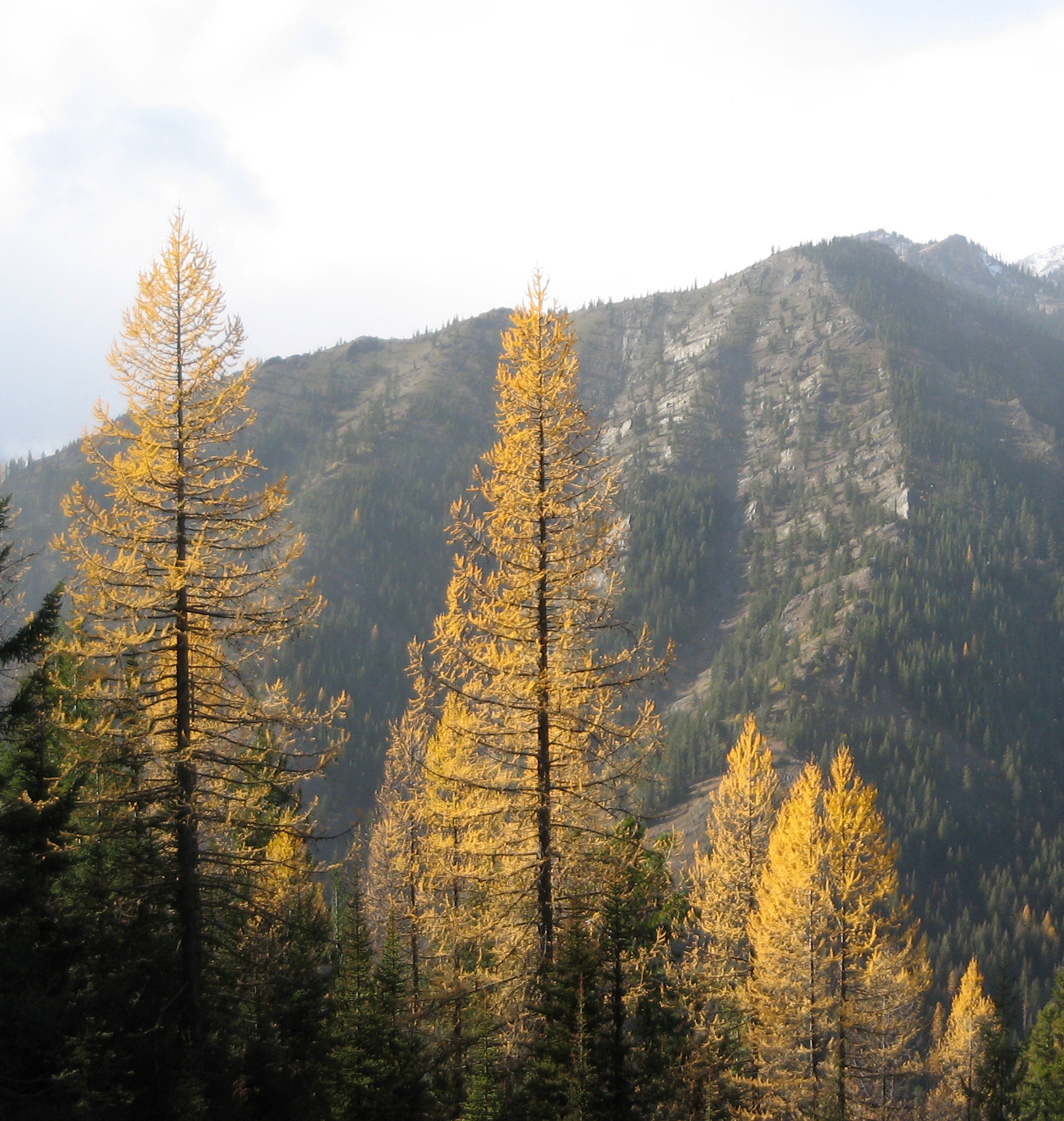
Western larch in autumn

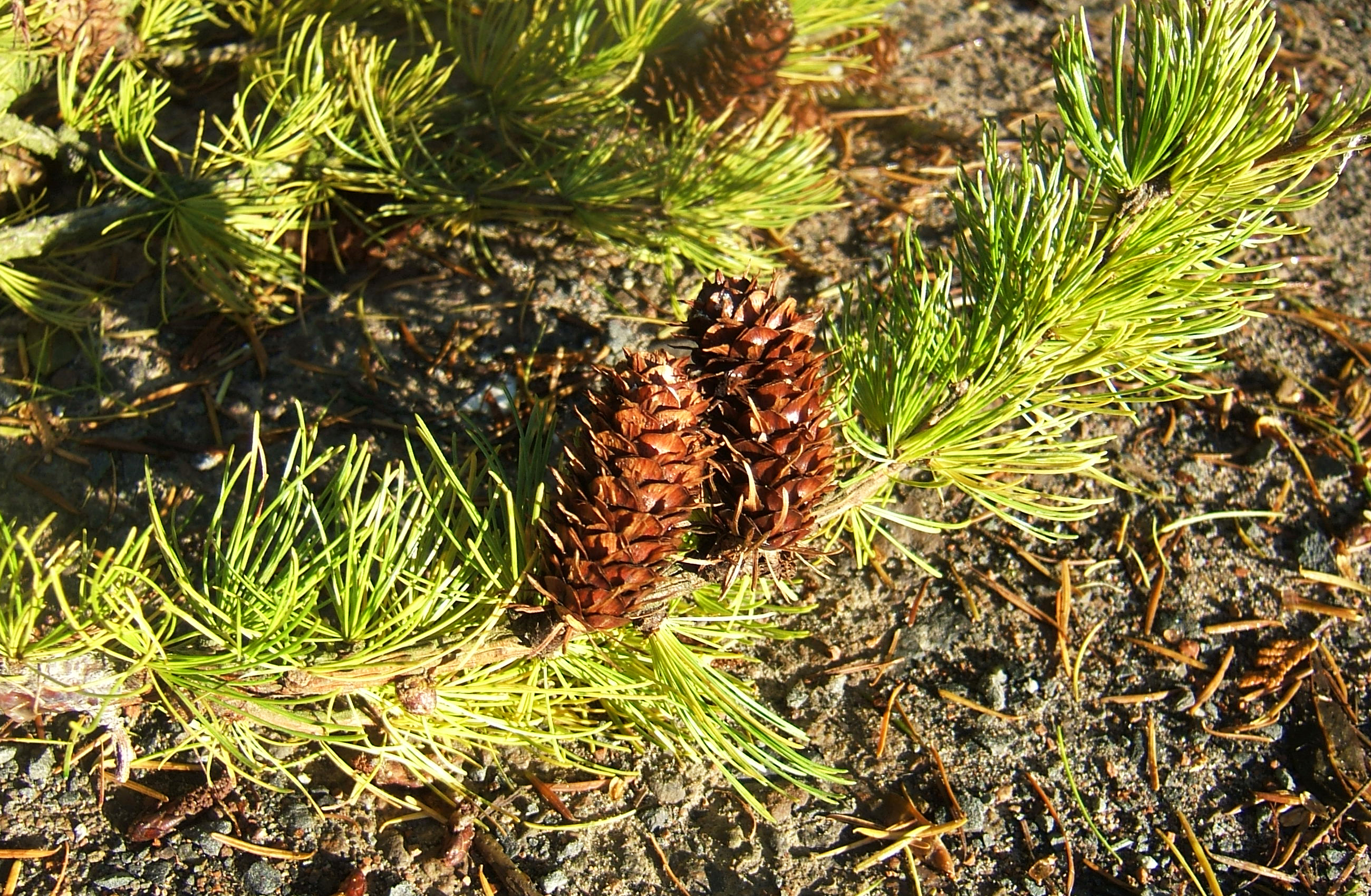
Leaves and mature cones

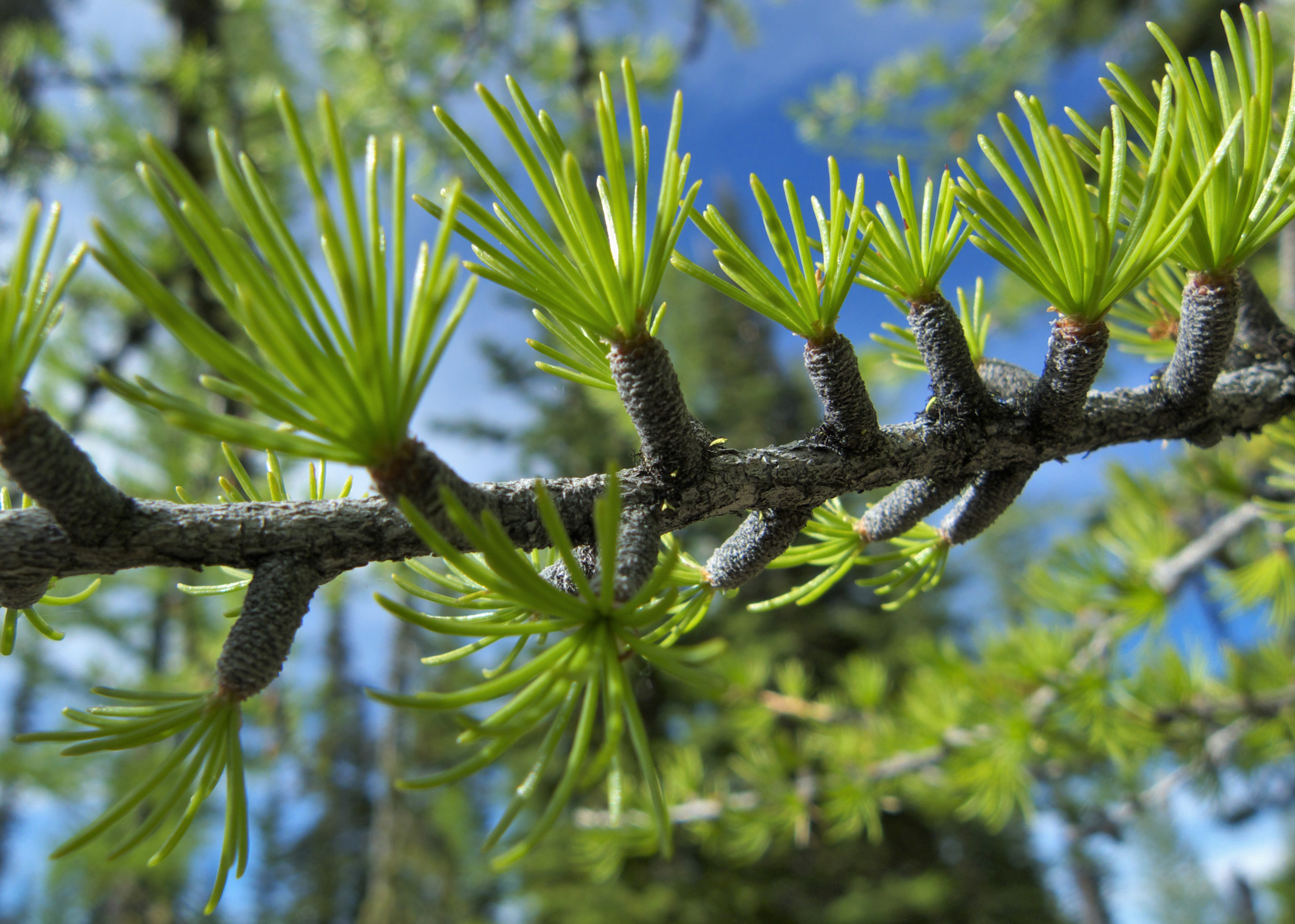
Larix occidentalis

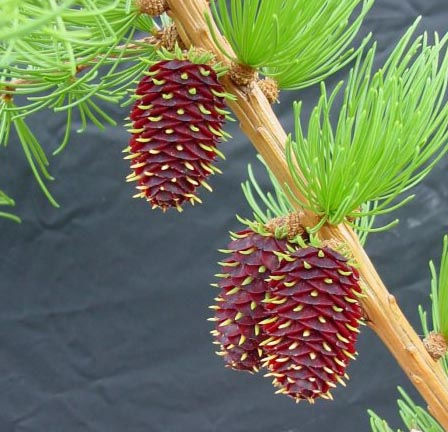
Young cones
