= Galactan endo-1,6-beta-galactosidase =

Identifiers
- EC no.: 3.2.1.164

Databases
- IntEnz: IntEnz view
- BRENDA: BRENDA entry
- ExPASy: NiceZyme view
- KEGG: KEGG entry
- MetaCyc: metabolic pathway
- PRIAM: profile
- PDB structures: RCSB PDB PDBe PDBsum
Search
- PMC: articles
- PubMed: articles
- NCBI: proteins

Galactan endo-1,6-beta-galactosidase (EC 3.2.1.164, endo-1,6-beta-galactanase) is an enzyme with systematic name endo-beta-(1->6)-galactanase. This enzyme catalyses the following chemical reaction

Endohydrolysis of (1->6)-beta-D-galactosidic linkages in arabinogalactan proteins and (1->3):(1->6)-beta-galactans to yield galactose and (1->6)-beta-galactobiose as the final products

The enzyme specifically hydrolyses 1,6-beta-D-galactooligosaccharides with a degree of polymerization (DP) higher than 3.
