= Larch Butte =

Mountain in Idaho, United States

Coordinates: 46°32′22″N 115°31′39″W

Larch Butte is a summit in the U.S. state of Idaho, with an elevation of 5,548 feet (1,691 m).

Larch Butte was named after the western larch tree (Larix occidentalis).
