= Arabinogalactan endo-β-1,4-galactanase =

Identifiers
- EC no.: 3.2.1.89
- CAS no.: 58182-40-4

Databases
- IntEnz: IntEnz view
- BRENDA: BRENDA entry
- ExPASy: NiceZyme view
- KEGG: KEGG entry
- MetaCyc: metabolic pathway
- PRIAM: profile
- PDB structures: RCSB PDB PDBe PDBsum
Search
- PMC: articles
- PubMed: articles
- NCBI: proteins

Arabinogalactan endo-β-1,4-galactanase (EC 3.2.1.89, endo-1,4-β-galactanase, galactanase, arabinogalactanase, ganB (gene)) is an enzyme with systematic name arabinogalactan 4-β-D-galactanohydrolase. It specifically catalyses the hydrolysis (1→4)-β-D-galactosidic linkages in type I arabinogalactans.

It is isolated from the bacterium Bacillus subtilis.
