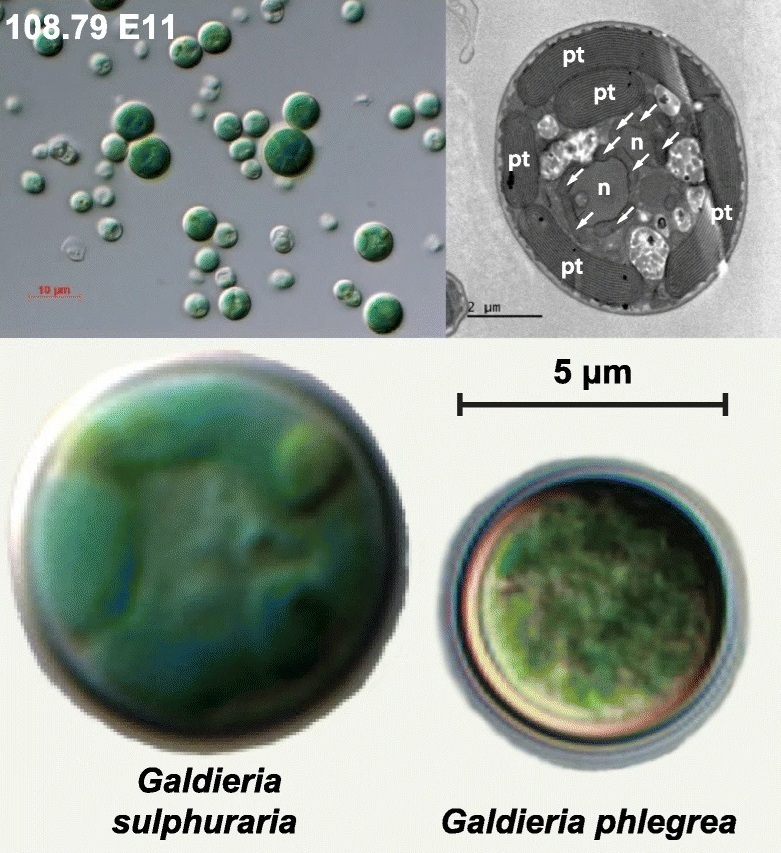

Scientific classification
- Domain: Eukaryota
- Clade: Archaeplastida
- Division: Rhodophyta
- Class: Cyanidiophyceae
- Order: Cyanidiales
- Family: Galdieriaceae
- Genus: Galdieria; Merola et al., 1981

= Galdieria =

Genus of red algae

Galdieria is a genus of red algae belonging to the order Galdieriales; family Galdieriaceae. It was first described by Italian botanist Aldo Merola in 1981 to differentiate it from species of Cyanidium.

Species:

- Galdieria daedala O.Yu.Sentsova, 1991
- Galdieria maxima O.Yu.Sentsova, 1991
- Galdieria partita O.Yu.Sentsova, 1991
- Galdieria phlegrea Pinto et al., 2007
- Galdieria sulphuraria (Galdieri) Merola et al., 1981
- Galdieria javensis H.S.Yoon et al., 2023
- Galdieria yellowstonesis H.S.Yoon et al., 2023

There are around 7 species in Galdieria, with cryptic species in the species complex G. sulphuraria. The species in Galdieria are extremophilic and mixotrophic, using more than 50 external carbon source for metabolism.

Recently, researchers have induced haploid cell generation and sexual reproduction in G. sulphuraria(NIES-550), G. yellowstonesis(SAG108.79) and G. partita(NBRC102759) under the condition of pH=1.0. Both diploid and haploid cells are mixotrophic, but only diploid cells have a cell wall. Diploid cells can tolerate a wider range of pH, but haploid cells might dominate at lower pH. There are two haploid cell types. One is the common round cell, while the other is the 'tadpole-shaped' cell. The latter is motile, but the tail is not a cilium. Two kinds of haploid cells were found during isogamous mating. One is heterozygous. Homozygous individuals results from self-diploidization by haploid endoreduplication under acetic acid stress. The previous observation of life cycle in Galdieria was regarded as asexual reproduction, although some molecular evidence showed up to five recombination events in the calmodulin gene of a Galdieria population from Tuscany, possibly indicating sexual reproduction.

This lineage mainly thrives in acid-sulfur geothermal areas (30–60 °C, pH=0.0–4.0). They may be tolerant of such extreme environmental conditions as a result of horizontal gene transfer (HGT) from prokaryotes, which accounts for about 1% of the genes in Galdieria.

The unique physiology and ecology of Galdieria make it a suitable organism to investigate the adaptation and evolution of eukaryotes on the early earth.

The other application of Galdieria is in the treatment of water pollution, because of its mixotrophic metabolism and high tolerance to metals.

While some cryptic species likely remain to be identified, at least 15 genomes of different strains of this genus have been reported by NCBI.
