= Epiphloea =

Epiphloea may refer to:

- Epiphloea (alga), a genus of algae in the family Halymeniaceae
- Epiphloea (fungus), a genus of fungi in the family Heppiaceae
