= X8 =

X8 or X-8 may refer to:

== Arts and entertainment ==
- Mega Man X8, a video game
- Rockman X8 Original Soundtrack, the music of the video game
- WrestleMania X8, a catch event
- WWE WrestleMania X8, a video game designed on the former
- X-8 (artist), American artist and publisher
- X8 Music, a record label founded by Quadeca

== Electronics ==
- Electrologica X8, a digital computer
- Roland Fantom-X8, a synthesizer keyboard by Roland
- Sony Ericsson Xperia X8, a smartphone
- Motorola X8 Mobile Computing System, a chipset

== Transport ==
- Dassault 8X, a long range private jet made by Dassault Aviation
- Sehol X8, mid-size crossover SUV produced by JAC Motors
- X8 (New York City bus)
- X8, a Metrobus route
- Piaggio X8, an Italian-made motor scooter
- X8, IATA airline code for Ecuadorian airline Icaro Air

== Other uses ==
- X8 protein domain
- Aerojet General X-8, a missile

== See also ==
- 8X (disambiguation)
