= Epiphloea (alga) =

Scientific classification
- Domain: Eukaryota
- Clade: Archaeplastida
- Division: Rhodophyta
- Class: Florideophyceae
- Order: Halymeniales
- Family: Halymeniaceae
- Genus: Epiphloea; J.Agardh, 1890

Genus of algae

Epiphloea is a genus of algae belonging to the family Halymeniaceae.

Species:

- Epiphloea bullosa (Harvey) De Toni
- Epiphloea grandifolia J.Agardh
- Epiphloea harveyi J.Agardh
