= Galdieriaceae =

Scientific classification
- Clade: Archaeplastida
- Division: Rhodophyta
- Class: Cyanidiophyceae
- Order: Cyanidiales
- Family: Galdieriaceae; Merola 1981

Genus and species
- Galdieria Merola, 1982; Galdieria daedala O.Yu.Sentsova; Galdieria maxima O.Yu.Sentsova, 1991; Galdieria partita O.Yu.Sentsova; Galdieria phlegrea G.Pinto et al., 2007; Galdieria sulphuraria (Galdieri) Merola, 1982

Family of algae

Galdieriaceae is a family of red algae, one of two families in the order Cyanidiales.
