= 8X =

8X or 8-X may refer to:

- 8x, or eight times in multiplication
- 8X, code name for Enhanced Imaging System
- 8X, abbreviation for Octuple scull
- Precorrin-8X methylmutase
- South African Class 8X 2-8-0 locomotive
- 8X Bayshore; see List of San Francisco Municipal Railway lines
- Typ 8X; internal designation for Audi A1
- HTC Windows Phone 8X

== See also ==
- X8 (disambiguation)
