= Cryptonemiales =

Historic order of algae

The Cryptonemiales is a defunct algal order; it is synonymous with the Halymeniales and has significant overlap with the Nemastomatales.
