= Yariv reagent =

- Yariv reagent. Three example R groups shown: β-D-Galactose (βGal), β-D-Glucose (βGlc), β-D-Mannose (βMan).

Identifiers
3D model (JSmol)	alpha-Galactosyl: Interactive image; beta-Glucosyl: Interactive image
PubChem CID	alpha-Galactosyl: 136693563; beta-Glucosyl: 136594507
- InChI: alpha-Galactosyl: InChI=1S/C42H48N6O21/c49-13-22-28(52)34(58)37(61)40(67-22)64-19-7-1-16(2-8-19)43-46-25-31(55)26(47-44-17-3-9-20(10-4-17)65-41-38(62)35(59)29(53)23(14-50)68-41)33(57)27(32(25)56)48-45-18-5-11-21(12-6-18)66-42-39(63)36(60)30(54)24(15-51)69-42/h1-12,22-24,28-30,34-44,49-54,56,58-63H,13-15H2/t22-,23-,24-,28+,29+,30+,34+,35+,36+,37-,38-,39-,40+,41+,42+/m1/s1 Key: CDYGCPPQERMCPE-LKQUKSTNSA-N; beta-Glucosyl: InChI=1S/C42H48N6O21/c49-13-22-28(52)34(58)37(61)40(67-22)64-19-7-1-16(2-8-19)43-46-25-31(55)26(47-44-17-3-9-20(10-4-17)65-41-38(62)35(59)29(53)23(14-50)68-41)33(57)27(32(25)56)48-45-18-5-11-21(12-6-18)66-42-39(63)36(60)30(54)24(15-51)69-42/h1-12,22-24,28-30,34-44,49-54,56,58-63H,13-15H2/t22-,23-,24-,28-,29-,30-,34+,35+,36+,37-,38-,39-,40-,41-,42-/m1/s1 Key: CDYGCPPQERMCPE-DTYGZFTESA-N
- SMILES: alpha-Galactosyl: C1=CC(=CC=C1NN=C2C(=C(C(=O)C(=NNC3=CC=C(C=C3)O[C@@H]4[C@@H]([C@H]([C@H]([C@H](O4)CO)O)O)O)C2=O)N=NC5=CC=C(C=C5)O[C@@H]6[C@@H]([C@H]([C@H]([C@H](O6)CO)O)O)O)O)O[C@@H]7[C@@H]([C@H]([C@H]([C@H](O7)CO)O)O)O; beta-Glucosyl: C1=CC(=CC=C1NN=C2C(=C(C(=O)C(=NNC3=CC=C(C=C3)O[C@H]4[C@@H]([C@H]([C@@H]([C@H](O4)CO)O)O)O)C2=O)N=NC5=CC=C(C=C5)O[C@H]6[C@@H]([C@H]([C@@H]([C@H](O6)CO)O)O)O)O)O[C@H]7[C@@H]([C@H]([C@@H]([C@H](O7)CO)O)O)O

Properties
Chemical formula	C_{42}H_{48}N_{6}O_{21}
Molar mass	972.867 g·mol^{−1}
- Except where otherwise noted, data are given for materials in their standard state (at 25 °C [77 °F], 100 kPa). Infobox references

Yariv reagent (1,3,5-tri(p-glycosyloxyphenylazo)-2,4,6-trihydroxybenzene) is a glycosylated phenolic compound that binds strongly to galactans and arabinogalactan proteins. It can therefore be used in their detection, quantification, precipitation, isolation, staining, and interfere with their function. It was initially synthesised in 1962 as an antigen for carbohydrate-binding antibodies but has subsequently become more broadly used. There are many variants of Yariv reagents which vary in the glycosyl groups on the outside of the structure, typically glucose, galactose, and mannose.

A biographical article about Joseph Yariv was published by the Journal of Applied Crystallography.
