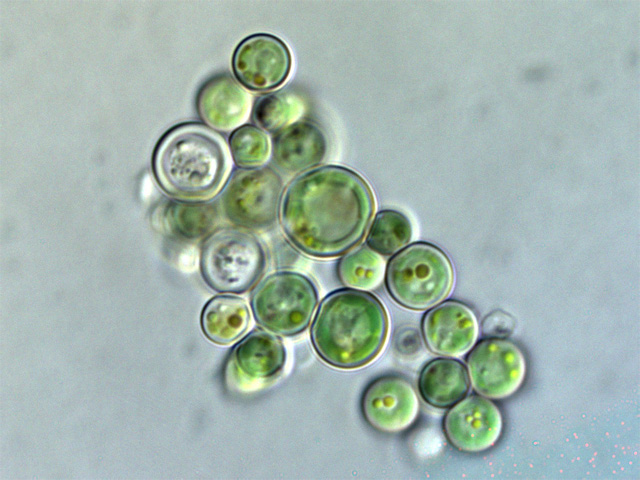
- Cyanidium sp.

Scientific classification
- Clade: Archaeplastida
- Division: Rhodophyta
- Subdivision: Cyanidiophytina; H.S.Yoon, K.M.Müller, R.G.Sheath, F.D.Ott & D.Bhattacharya, 2006

Classes
- Cyanidiophyceae Merola

= Cyanidiophytina =

Group of algae

Cyanidiophytina is a subdivision of red algae.

In older texts it was described as an order "Cyanidiales". It was granted division status in the Saunders and Hommersand 2004 classification (as "Cyanidophyta"), but was only elevated to subdivision Cyanidiophytina in the Yoon et al. classification of 2006.
