= Floridean starch =

Type of storage glucan

Illustration of glucose polymer branching.

Floridean starch is a type of storage glucan found in glaucophytes and in red algae (or rhodophytes), in which it is usually the primary sink for fixed carbon from photosynthesis. It is found in grains or granules in the cell's cytoplasm and is composed of an α-linked glucose polymer with a degree of branching intermediate between amylopectin and glycogen, though more similar to the former. The polymers that make up floridean starch are sometimes referred to as "semi-amylopectin".

== Properties ==
Floridean starch consists of a polymer of glucose molecules connected primarily by α(1,4) linkages, with occasional branch points using α(1,6) linkages. It differs from other common α-linked glucose polymers in the frequency and position of the branches, which gives rise to different physical properties. The structure of floridean starch polymers is most similar to amylopectin and is sometimes described as "semi-amylopectin". Floridean starch is often described in contrast to starch (a mixture of amylopectin and amylose) and glycogen:

	Floridean starch	Starch	Glycogen
Organisms	Red algae, glaucophytes	Green algae, plants	Some bacteria, some archaea, fungi, animals
Composition	Semi-amylopectin; classically without amylose, though some examples exist with amylose present	Amylopectin and amylose	Glycogen
Storage location	In the cytosol	Inside plastids	In the cytosol
Building block	UDP-glucose	ADP-glucose	Eukaryotes: UDP-glucose Bacteria: ADP-glucose
Branching	Intermediate level of branching	Amylopectin: Branches are relatively rare and occur in clusters Amylose: Almost entirely linear	Branches are relatively frequent and evenly distributed
Genes required for maintenance	Fewer than 12	30–40	6–12

Historically, floridean starch has been described as lacking amylose. However, amylose has been identified as a component of floridean starch granules in some cases, particularly in unicellular red algae.

== Evolution ==
Features such as UDP-glucose building blocks and cytosolic storage differentiate the Archaeplastida into two groups: the rhodophytes and glaucophytes, which use floridean starch, and the green algae and plants (Chloroplastida), which use amylopectin and amylose. There is strong phylogenomic evidence that the Archaeplastida are monophyletic and originate from a single primary endosymbiosis event involving a heterotrophic eukaryote and a photosynthetic cyanobacterium.

Evidence indicates that both ancestors would have had established mechanisms for carbon storage. Based on review of the genetic complement of modern plastid genomes, the last common ancestor of the Archaeplastida is hypothesized to have possessed a cytosolic storage mechanism and to have lost most of the endosymbiotic cyanobacterium's corresponding genes. According to this hypothesis, the rhodophytes and glaucophytes retained the ancestral eukaryote's cytosolic starch deposition. Starch synthesis and degradation in green algae and plants is much more complex – but significantly, many of the enzymes that perform these metabolic functions in the interior of modern plastids are identifiably of eukaryotic rather than bacterial origin.

In a few cases, red algae have been found to use cytosolic glycogen rather than floridean starch as a storage polymer; examples such as Galdieria sulphuraria are found in the Cyanidiales, which are unicellular extremophiles.

Other organisms whose evolutionary history suggests secondary endosymbiosis of a red alga also use storage polymers similar to floridean starch, for example, dinoflagellates and cryptophytes. The presence of floridean starch-like storage in some apicomplexan parasites is one piece of evidence supporting a red algal ancestry for the apicoplast, a non-photosynthetic organelle.

== History ==
Floridean starch is named for a class of red algae, the Florideae (now usually termed Florideophyceae). It was first identified in the mid-19th century and extensively studied by biochemists in the mid-20th century.
