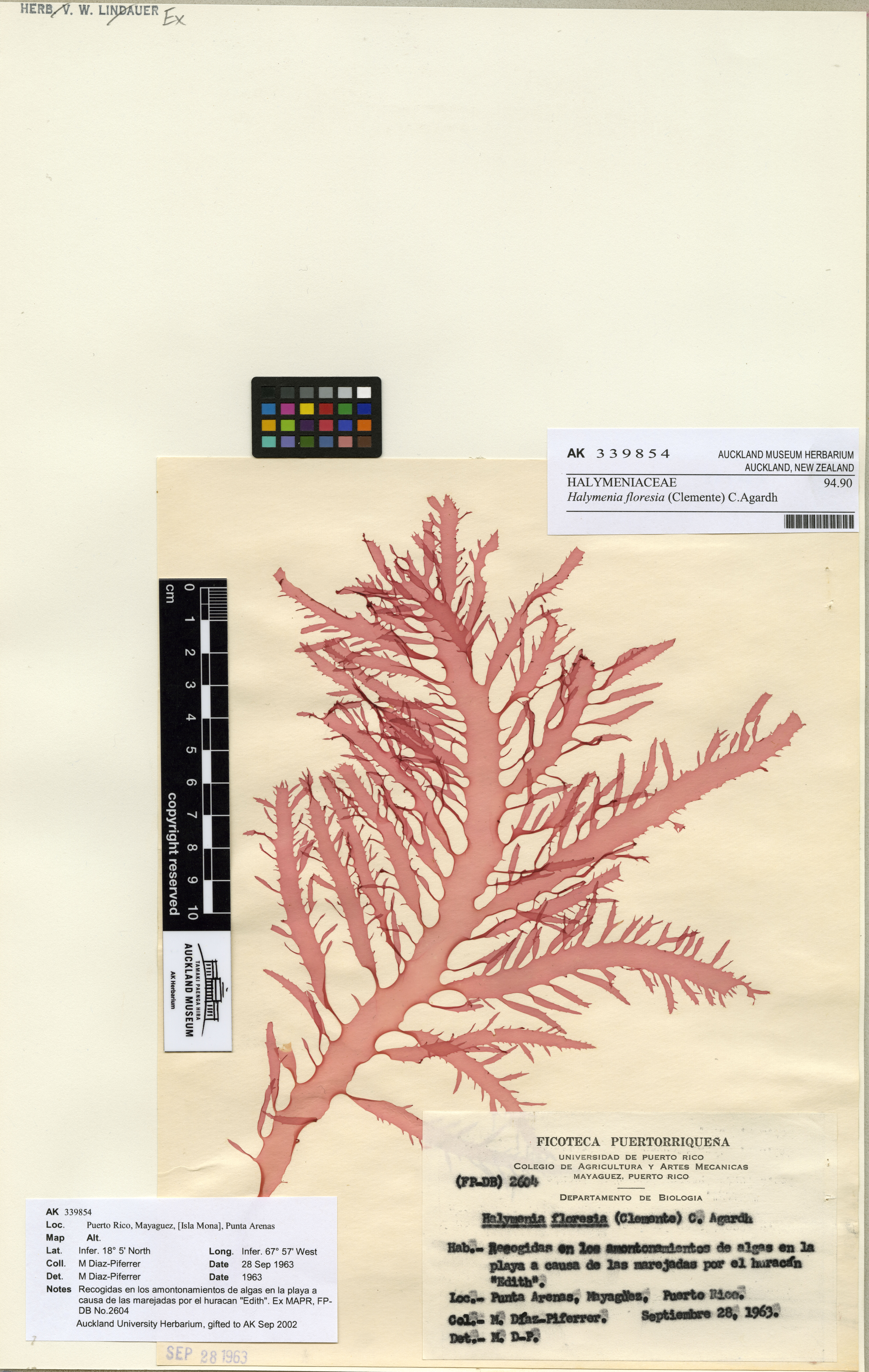
- Halymenia floresii

Scientific classification
- Clade: Archaeplastida
- Division: Rhodophyta
- Class: Florideophyceae
- Order: Halymeniales
- Family: Halymeniaceae
- Genus: Halymenia; C.Agardh

= Halymenia =

Genus of algae

Halymenia a genus of a macroscopic red algae that grows in oceans worldwide.

Species have been found in cold temperate areas but the highest diversity is found in warm temperate and tropical regions. For example, 41 names have been reported for the Indo-Pacific (Guiry & Guiry, 2011). Silva et al. (1996) listed 22 names (including two varieties) for the Indian Ocean.

== Species ==
It includes the following species:

- Halymenia abyssicola E.Y.Dawson
- Halymenia actinophysa M.A.Howe
- Halymenia angusta (J.Agardh) De Toni
- Halymenia asymmetrica Gargiulo, de Masi & Tripodi
- Halymenia bifida E.Y.Dawson
- Halymenia brasiliana S.M.P.B.Guimarães & M.T.Fujii
- Halymenia californica G.M.Smith & Hollenberg
- Halymenia carnosa
- Halymenia cerratei C.O.Acleto
- Halymenia chiangiana I.A.Abbott & Kraft
- Halymenia clathrata E.C.Oliveira, Pinheiro-Vieira & R.E.Norris
- Halymenia cromwellii I.A.Abbott
- Halymenia curvicornis J.Agardh
- Halymenia dilatata Zanardini
- Halymenia dubia Bory de Saint-Vincent
- Halymenia duchassaingii (J.Agardh) Kylin
- Halymenia durvillei Bory de Saint-Vincent
- Halymenia echinophysa F.S.Collins & M.A.Howe
- Halymenia elongata C.Agardh
- Halymenia fasciata Bory de Saint-Vincent
- Halymenia fimbriata Zanardini
- Halymenia flabellata F.Schmitz
- Halymenia floresii (Clemente) C.Agardh
- Halymenia floridana J.Agardh
- Halymenia foliacea W.R.Taylor
- Halymenia formosa Harvey ex Kützing
- Halymenia gardneri (Kylin) P.G.Parkinson
- Halymenia hancockii W.R.Taylor
- Halymenia harveyana J.Agardh
- Halymenia hawaiiana Hernández-Kantun & A.R.Sherwood
- Halymenia hollenbergii I.A.Abbott
- Halymenia hvarii Ercegovic
- Halymenia imbricata Dickie
- Halymenia integra M.A.Howe & W.R.Taylor
- Halymenia jelinekii Grunow
- Halymenia kraftii Womersley & J.A.Lewis
- Halymenia kuetzingii A.J.K.Millar
- Halymenia lacerata Sonder
- Halymenia latifolia P.L.Crouan & H.M.Crouan ex Kützing
- Halymenia lubrica Suhr
- Halymenia maculata J.Agardh
- Halymenia megaspora E.Y.Dawson
- Halymenia microcarpa (Montagne) P.C.Silva
- Halymenia mirabilis D.L.Ballantine & H.Ruiz
- Halymenia muelleri Sonder
- Halymenia multifida Zanardini
- Halymenia naegelii Kützing
- Halymenia nukuhivensis N'Yuert & Payri
- Halymenia plana Zanardini
- Halymenia platycarpa (Harvey ex Grunow) J.Agardh
- Halymenia pluriloba Ercegovic
- Halymenia polyclada A.Gepp & E.S.Gepp
- Halymenia porphyraeformis Parkinson
- Halymenia porphyroides Børgesen
- Halymenia pseudofloresii F.S.Collins & M.A.Howe
- Halymenia purpurascens
- Halymenia pusilla Sonder
- Halymenia refugiensis E.Y.Dawson
- Halymenia rhodymenioides Ercegovic
- Halymenia rosea M.A.Howe & W.R.Taylor
- Halymenia santamariae W.R.Taylor
- Halymenia schizymenioides Hollenberg & I.A.Abbott
- Halymenia stipitata I.A.Abbott
- Halymenia tenera M.A.Howe
- Halymenia tenuispina Kützing
- Halymenia tondoana O.DeClerck & Hernández-Kantun
- Halymenia utriana W.R.Taylor
- Halymenia venusta Børgesen
- Halymenia vinacea M.A.Howe & W.R.Taylor
