= P4HA1 =

Protein-coding gene in the species Homo sapiens

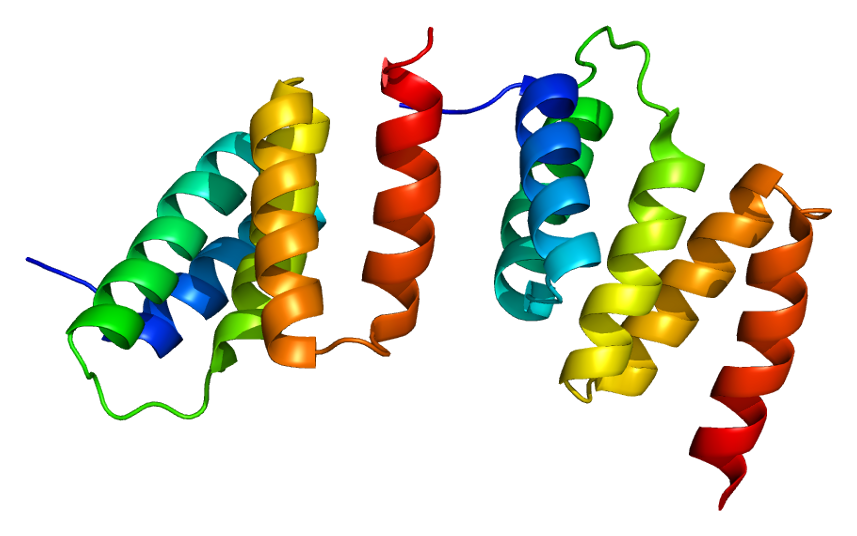

Identifiers
- Aliases: P4HA1, P4HA, prolyl 4-hydroxylase subunit alpha 1
- External IDs: OMIM: 176710; MGI: 97463; GeneCards: P4HA1
Available structures
PDB	Ortholog search: PDBe RCSB
PDB	List of PDB id codes 1TJC, 2V5F, 2YQ8, 4BT8, 4BT9, 4BTA, 4BTB
Enzyme activity
EC #	BRENDA	ExPASy	KEGG	MetaCyc
1.14.11.2	↗	↗	↗	↗

Gene location (Human)
Chr.	Chromosome 10 (human)
Band	10q22.1	Start	73,007,217 bp
Band	10q22.1	End	73,096,974 bp

Gene location (Mouse)
Chr.	Chromosome 10 (mouse)
Band	10|10 B4	Start	59,159,118 bp
Band	10|10 B4	End	59,209,126 bp
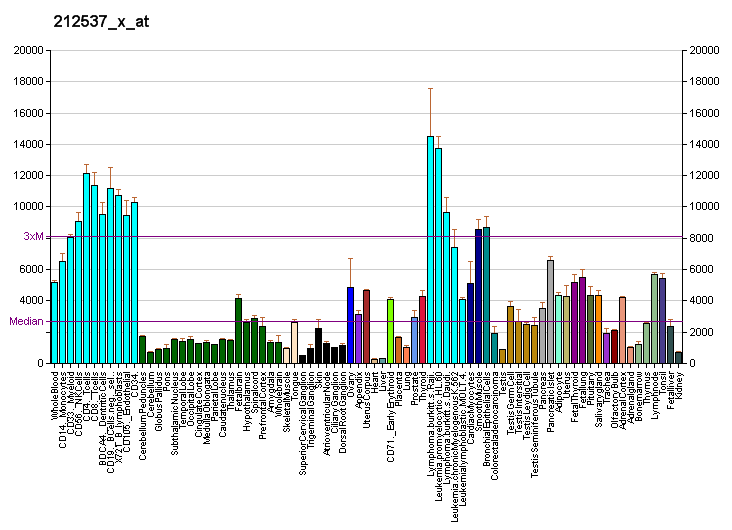

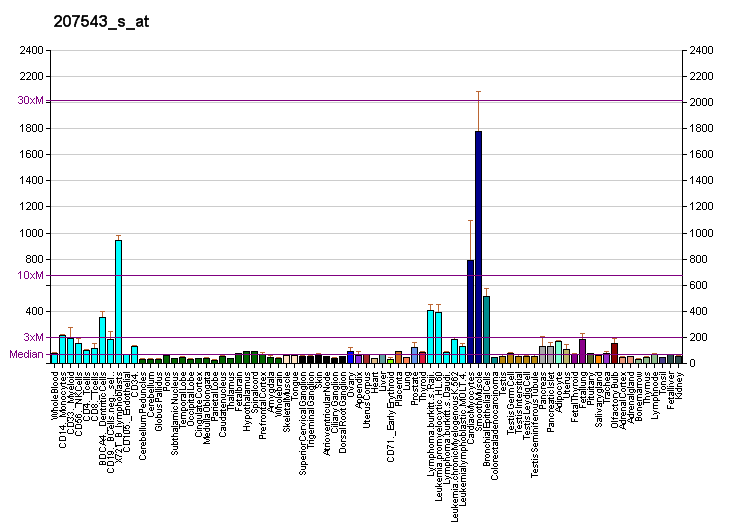
RNA expression pattern
Bgee	Human / Mouse (ortholog); Top expressed in: cartilage tissue; Achilles tendon; tibia; ventricular zone; pericardium; stromal cell of endometrium; periodontal fiber; gastrocnemius muscle; tibialis anterior muscle; triceps brachii muscle / Top expressed in: calvaria; epithelium of lens; stroma of bone marrow; right lung lobe; dermis; body of femur; cumulus cell; sciatic nerve; yolk sac; umbilical cord; More reference expression data
BioGPS	More reference expression data
Gene ontology
Molecular function	iron ion binding; L-ascorbic acid binding; oxidoreductase activity; protein binding; oxidoreductase activity, acting on single donors with incorporation of molecular oxygen, incorporation of two atoms of oxygen; dioxygenase activity; procollagen-proline 4-dioxygenase activity; oxidoreductase activity, acting on paired donors, with incorporation or reduction of molecular oxygen; metal ion binding; identical protein binding
Cellular component	procollagen-proline 4-dioxygenase complex; endoplasmic reticulum; mitochondrion; membrane; intracellular membrane-bounded organelle; endoplasmic reticulum lumen
Biological process	peptidyl-proline hydroxylation to 4-hydroxy-L-proline; collagen fibril organization
Sources:Amigo / QuickGO
Orthologs
Databases	NCBI: entry; OMA: entry
Species	Human	Mouse
Entrez	5033	18451
Ensembl	ENSG00000122884	ENSMUSG00000019916
UniProt	P13674	Q60715
RefSeq (mRNA)	NM_001142596; NM_000917; NM_001017962; NM_001142595	NM_011030; NM_001316370; NM_001316371
RefSeq (protein)	NP_000908; NP_001017962; NP_001136067; NP_001136068	NP_001303299; NP_001303300; NP_035160
Location (UCSC)	Chr 10: 73.01 – 73.1 Mb	Chr 10: 59.16 – 59.21 Mb
PubMed search
- Wikidata
View/Edit Human	View/Edit Mouse

Prolyl 4-hydroxylase subunit alpha-1 is an enzyme that in humans is encoded by the P4HA1 gene.

This gene encodes a component of prolyl 4-hydroxylase, a key enzyme in collagen synthesis composed of two identical alpha subunits and two beta subunits. The encoded protein is one of several different types of alpha subunits and provides the major part of the catalytic site of the active enzyme. In collagen and related proteins, prolyl 4-hydroxylase catalyzes the formation of 4-hydroxyproline that is essential to the proper three-dimensional folding of newly synthesized procollagen chains. Alternatively spliced transcript variants encoding different isoforms have been described.
