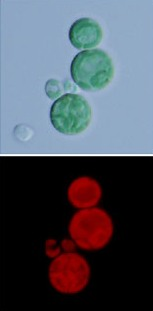
- A picture of Galdieria sulphuraria as observed under a microscope

Scientific classification
- Domain: Eukaryota
- Clade: Archaeplastida
- Division: Rhodophyta
- Class: Cyanidiophyceae
- Order: Cyanidiales
- Family: Galdieriaceae
- Genus: Galdieria
- Species: G. sulphuraria

Binomial name
- Galdieria sulphuraria Merola et al., 1981

= Galdieria sulphuraria =

Extremophilic unicellular species of red alga

Galdieria sulphuraria is an extremophilic unicellular species of red algae. It is the type species of the genus Galdieria. It is known for its broad metabolic capacities, including photosynthesis and heterotrophic growth on over 50 different extracellular carbon sources. The members of the class Cyanidiophyceae are among the most acidophilic known photosynthetic organisms, and the growth conditions of G. sulphuraria – pH between 0 and 4, and temperatures up to 56 °C – are among the most extreme known for eukaryotes. Analysis of its genome suggests that its thermoacidophilic adaptations derive from horizontal gene transfer from archaea and bacteria, another rarity among eukaryotes.

== History and taxonomy ==
Published descriptions of thermoacidophilic unicellular algae date to the mid-19th century. The earliest description of an organism corresponding to the modern G. sulphuraria was published in 1899 by an Italian scientist, A. Galdieri, who gave it the name Pleurococcus sulphurarius. The taxonomy of thermoacidophilic algae was revised in 1981, which introduced the genus Galdieria and gave the organism its modern designation. G. sulphuraria is the type species for this genus.

The group to which G. sulphuraria belongs, the Cyanidiophyceae, is the most deeply branching subgroup of the Rhodophyta (red algae), meaning they were the earliest to diverge in the evolutionary history of this group.

== Metabolism ==
G. sulphuraria is noted for its extreme metabolic flexibility: it is capable of photosynthesis and can also grow heterotrophically on a wide variety of carbon sources, including diverse carbohydrates. Over 50 different carbon sources that support growth have been reported. Careful measurements of its growth patterns under laboratory conditions suggest that it is not a true mixotroph capable of using both energy sources at the same time; rather, it prefers heterotrophic growth conditions and downregulates photosynthesis after extended exposure to extracellular carbon sources. Analysis of the G. sulphuraria photosystem I complex, a key photosynthetic component, suggests a structure intermediate between the homologous complexes in cyanobacteria and plants.

Although most red algae use floridean starch as a storage glucan, G. sulphuraria uses a highly unusual form of glycogen which is among the most highly branched glycogens known, has very short branch lengths, and forms particles of unusually low molecular weight. These properties are believed to be metabolic adaptations to extreme environmental conditions, although the precise mechanism is unclear.

== Habitat and ecology ==
G. sulphuraria is unusual for a eukaryote in being thermoacidophilic – that is, capable of growing at both high temperature and low pH. It grows well in a pH range of 0–4 and at temperatures up to 56 °C, close to the approximately 60 °C sometimes cited as the likely maximum for eukaryotic life. It is also highly tolerant of high salt concentrations and of toxic metals. It is found in naturally acidic hot springs, in solfataric environments, and in polluted environments; It is also found in endolithic ecosystems, where light is scarce and its heterotrophic metabolic capacities are particularly important. Laboratory tests indicate that it is capable of actively acidifying its environment.

== Genome ==
The G. sulphuraria genome contains evidence of extensive horizontal gene transfer (HGT) from thermoacidophilic archaea and bacteria, explaining the origin of its adaptation to this environment. At least 5% of its proteome is likely to be derived from HGT. This is highly unusual for a eukaryote; relatively few well-substantiated examples exist of HGT from prokaryotes to eukaryotes.

The genome of its mitochondria is also exceptionally reduced with high mutation rates, and has a very high GC skew, while the genome of its plastids is of normal size but contains an unusual number of stem-loop structures. Both of these properties are proposed to be adaptations for the organism's polyextremophilic environment. By comparison to Cyanidioschyzon merolae – a unicellular thermoacidophilic red alga that is obligately photoautotrophic – the G. sulphuraria genome contains a large number of genes associated with carbohydrate metabolism and cross-membrane transport.

== Biotechnology ==
Because of its ability to tolerate extreme environments and grow under a wide variety of conditions, G. sulphuraria has been considered for use in bioremediation projects. For example, it has been tested for the ability to recover precious metals, recover rare-earth metals, and remove phosphorus and nitrogen from various waste streams.

It is also a source of proteins, especially phycocyanin which can be used in diagnostic histochemistry, and as a colorant in cosmetics or food applications. The phycocyanin produced by this species is notable for its thermo and acid resistance, making it suitable for use in the food industry.

In 2025, a study demonstrated that Galdieria strain 5587.1 can grow on industrial chocolate-factory waste as the sole carbon source and produce biomass containing approximately 3–3.8% C-phycocyanin by dry weight. The extracted C-phycocyanin remained stable at 72 °C, and the cultivation process was shown to be sustainable through repeated-batch (recycled-media) operation, indicating a potential low-cost, circular-economy route for food-waste valorization.
