= Extensin =

Family of glycoproteins found in plants

Extensins are a family of flexuous, rodlike, hydroxyproline-rich glycoproteins (HRGPs) of the plant cell wall.

They are highly abundant proteins. There are around 20 extensins in Arabidopsis thaliana. They form crosslinked networks in the young cell wall. Typically they have two major diagnostic repetitive peptide motifs, one hydrophilic and the other hydrophobic, with potential for crosslinking. Extensins are thought to act as self-assembling amphiphiles essential for cell-wall assembly and growth by cell extension and expansion. The name "extensin" encapsulates the hypothesis that they are involved in cell extension.

== Hydrophilic motif ==
This pentapeptide consists of serine (Ser) and four hydroxyprolines (Hyp): Ser-Hyp-Hyp-Hyp-Hyp. Hydroxyproline is unusual not only as a cyclic amino acid that restricts peptide flexibility but as an amino acid with no codon, being encoded as proline. Polypeptides targeted for secretion are subsequently hydroxylated by direct addition of molecular oxygen to proline at C-4. Extensin hydroxyproline is uniquely glycosylated with short chains of L-arabinose that further rigidify and increase hydrophilicity. Generally the serine has a single galactose attached.

== Hydrophobic tyrosine crosslinking motif ==
Two tyrosines separated by a single amino acid, typically valine or another tyrosine, form a short intra-molecular diphenylether crosslink. This can be crosslinked further by the enzyme extensin peroxidase to form an inter-molecular bridge between extensin molecules and thus form networks and sheets.
