= Nemastomatales =

Scientific classification
- Domain: Eukaryota
- Clade: Archaeplastida
- Division: Rhodophyta
- Class: Florideophyceae
- Subclass: Rhodymeniophycidae
- Order: Nemastomatales; Kylin 1925 emend.

Families
- Nemastomataceae Schmitz, 1892; Schizymeniaceae (Schmitz & Hauptfleisch) Masuda & Guiry

Order of algae

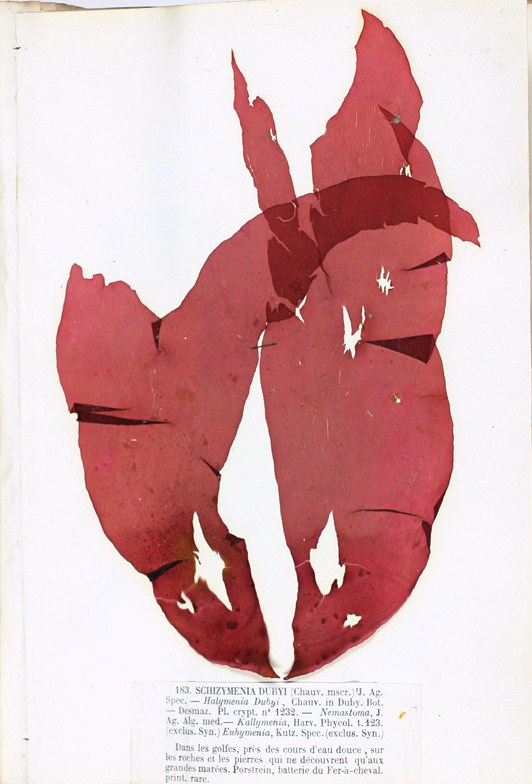
Nemastomatales

Nemastomatales is an order of red algae. It includes some members of the defunct order Cryptonemiales.
