= X8 protein domain =

X8

Identifiers
- Symbol: X8
- Pfam: PF07983
- InterPro: IPR012946
- SCOP2: 1occ / SCOPe / SUPFAM
Available protein structures:
- Pfam: structures / ECOD
- PDB: RCSB PDB; PDBe; PDBj
- PDBsum: structure summary

In molecular biology, the X8 domain, is thought to play a role in targeting the plasmodesmata by providing it with structural support. The domain is able to do this since it contains signal sequences for a glycosylphosphatidylinositol (GPI) linkage to the extracellular face of the plasma membrane. This domain is involved in carbohydrate binding.

== Structure ==
The X8 domain contains 6 conserved cysteine residues that presumably form three disulphide bridges. The domain is also found in an Olive pollen allergen as well as at the C terminus of family 17 glycosyl hydrolases.
