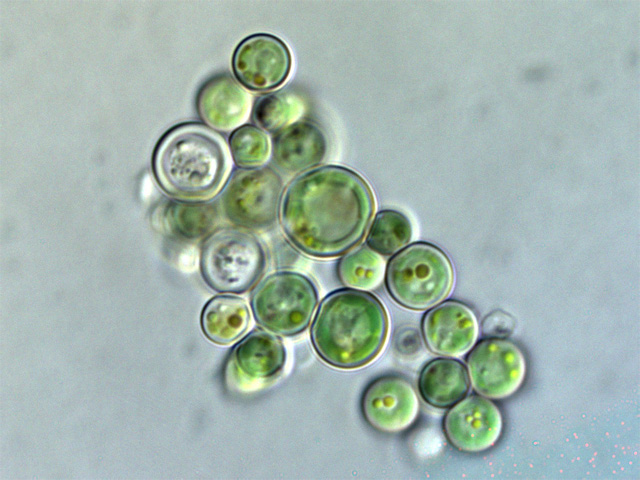
- Cyanidium sp.

Scientific classification
- Domain: Eukaryota
- Clade: Archaeplastida
- Division: Rhodophyta
- Class: Cyanidiophyceae
- Order: Cyanidiales; T.Christensen

Families
- Cavernulicolaceae; Cyanidiaceae; Cyanidioschyzonaceae; Galdieriaceae

= Cyanidiophyceae =

Class of algae

Cyanidiophyceae is a class of unicellular red algae within subdivision Cyanidiophytina, and contain a single plastid, one to three mitochondria, a nucleus, a vacuole, and floridean starch. Pyrenoids are absent. Most are extremophiles inhabiting acid hot springs with a pH between 0,2 and 4 and temperatures up to 56 °C. They originated in extreme environments with high temperatures and low pH, which allowed them to occupy ecological niches without any competition.

While still found in extreme environments, they have also adapted to live along streams, in fissures in rock walls and in soil, but usually prefer relatively high temperatures. They have never been found in basic freshwater or seawater habitats. The main photosynthetic pigment is C-phycocyanin. Except for Galdieria partita, which can reproduce sexually, reproduction is asexual by binary fission or formation of endospores. The group, consisting of a single order (Cyanidiales), split off from the other red algae more than a billion years ago. Three families, four genera, and nine species are known, but the total number of species is probably higher. They are primarily photoautotrophic, but heterotrophic and mixotrophic growth also occurs. After the first massive gene loss in the common ancestor of all red algae, where c. 25% of the genes were lost, a second gene loss occurred in the ancestor of Cyanidiophyceae, where an additional 18% of the genes were lost. Since then, some gene gains and minor gene losses have taken place independently in the Cyanidiaceae and Galdieriaceae, leading to genetic diversification between the two groups, with Galdieriaceae occupying more diverse and varied niches in extreme environments than Cyanidiaceae.
