= Arabinogalactan =

Bipolymer

Arabinogalactan, also known as galactoarabinan, larch arabinogalactan, and larch gum, is a biopolymer consisting of arabinose and galactose monosaccharides. Two classes of arabinogalactans are found in nature: plant arabinogalactan and microbial arabinogalactan. In plants, it is a major component of many gums, including gum arabic and gum ghatti. It is often found attached to proteins, and the resulting arabinogalactan protein (AGP) functions as both an intercellular signaling molecule and a glue to seal plant wounds.

The microbial arabinogalactan is a major structural component of the mycobacterial cell wall. Both the arabinose and galactose exist solely in the furanose configuration. The galactan portion of microbial arabinogalactan is linear, consisting of approximately 30 units with alternating β-(1-5) and β-(1-6) glycosidic linkages. The arabinan chain, which consists of about 30 residues, is attached at three branch points within the galactan chain, believed to be at residues 8, 10 and 12. The arabinan portion of the polymer is a complex branched structure, usually capped with mycolic acids; the arabinan glycosidic linkages are α-(1-3), α-(1-5), and β-(1-2).

The mycobacterial arabinogalactan is recognized by a putative immune lectin intelectin present in chordates.

== Structure of microbial arabinogalactan ==
Structure of arabinogalactan

The reducing end of microbial arabinogalactan consists of the terminal sequence →5)-D-Galf-(1→4)-L-Rhap-(1→3)-D-GlcNAc. A muramyl-6-P is also found within the peptidoglycan functional group. The mycolylarabinogalactan of mycobacteria is attached to the peptidoglycan by the actinomycete-specific diglycosylphosphoryl bridge, L-Rhap-(1→3)-D-GlcNAc-(1→P).

Arabinogalactan contains a galactan chain, with alternating 5-linked β-D-galactofuranosyl (Galf) and 6-linked β-D-Galf residues. The arabinan chains are attached to C-5 of some of the 6-linked Galf residues. There are three major structural domains for arabinan. The first is a domain consisting of linear 5-linked α-D-Araf residues. The second is a domain with branched 3,5 linked α-D-Araf residues substituted with 5-linked α-D-Araf units at both branched positions, and the third is A terminal non-reducing domain for end arabinan consisting of a 3,5-linked α-D-Araf residue substituted at both branched positions with the disaccharide β-D Araf-(1→2)- α-D-Araf. These three arabinan chains are attached to the galactan at residues 8, 10, and 12.

The non-reducing end of arabinogalactan is covalently attached to the mycolic acids of the outer membrane. The hydrophobicity of mycolic acids is a barrier to drug entry. Additionally, the mycolyl arabinogalactan peptidoglycan is responsible for aspects of disease pathogenesis and much of the antibody response in infections. The mycolyl substituents are selectively and equally distributed on the 5-hydroxyl functions of terminal- and the penultimate 2-linked Araf residues. The mycolyl residues are clustered in groups of four on the non reducing terminal pentaarabinosyl unit (β-Araf-(1→2)-α-Araf)_{2}-3,5-α-Araf . Thus, the majority (66%) of the pentaarabinosyl units are substituted by mycolic acids, leaving the minority (33%) available for interaction with the immune system.

Approximately one of the three arabinosyl chains attached to the galactan chain contains succinyl groups. Although one succinyl group is most common, up to three succinyl groups per released arabinan fragment can be found on oligo-arabinans. However, arabinan fragments substituted with GalNH_{2} are not succinylated. Importantly, in the case of M. tuberculosis, and most likely in all slow growing organisms, both positive charge (protonated GalNH_{2}as GalNH_{3}^{+}) and negative charge (succinyl) are present in the middle regions of the arabinan, specifically at O-2 of the inner 3,5-α-D-Araf units. The succinyl residues are on the non-mycolylated chain. Recently, a complete primary model of arabinogalactan has been proposed.

== Commercial applications ==
It is used as a thickener in foods, in cosmetics, and is being studied for possible medical uses.

== See also ==
- Mycobacterium
- Carbohydrate chemistry
