= Galactan =

Names
- Other names D-Galactan; Galactosan

Identifiers
CAS Number	9037-55-2
ChEBI	CHEBI:37165
KEGG	C05796

Properties
Chemical formula	(C_{6}H_{10}O_{5})_{n}
Molar mass	Variable
- Except where otherwise noted, data are given for materials in their standard state (at 25 °C [77 °F], 100 kPa). Infobox references

Galactan (galactosan) is a polysaccharide consisting of polymerized galactose. In general, galactans in natural sources contain a core of galactose units connected by α(1→3) or α(1→6), with structures containing other monosaccharides as side-chains.

Galactan derived from Anogeissus latifolia is primarily α(1→6), but galactan from acacia trees is primarily α(1→3).

Halymenia durvillei is a red seaweed (algae) that produces a sulfated galactan. Several other algae species also contain galactans. Including Carpopeltis F.Schmitz, 1895.

Galactan is found in the side chains of rhamnogalacturonan I (RG-I) and is needed for gel formation in the cell walls of organisms. It was observed there was less of the gelling characteristic (as well as the polymeric chains being more likely to degrade) when fewer galactans were present in the polymeric side chains.

== See also ==
- Agar
- Galactooligosaccharide
