= Fluorophore =

Agents that emit light after excitation by light

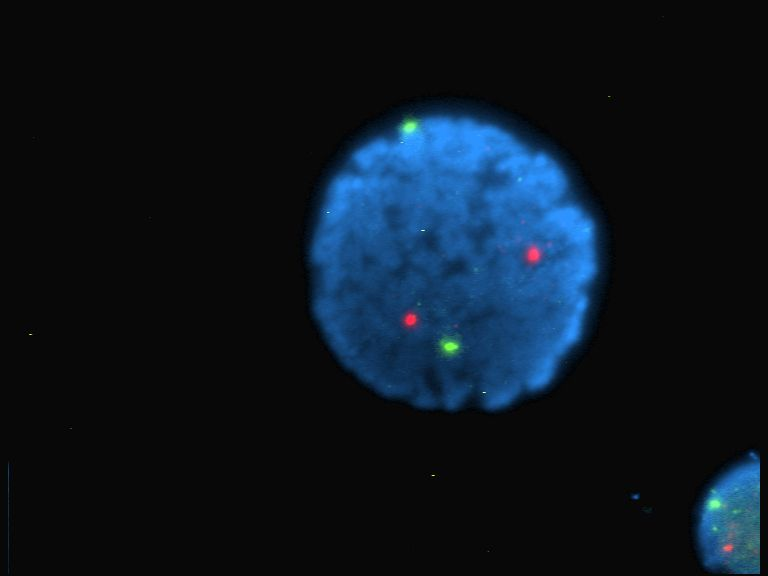
A fluorophore-labeled human cell

A fluorophore (or fluorochrome, similarly to a chromophore) is a fluorescent chemical compound that can re-emit light upon light excitation. Fluorophores typically contain several combined aromatic groups, or planar or cyclic molecules with several π bonds.

Fluorophores are sometimes used alone, as a tracer in fluids, as a dye for staining of certain structures, as a substrate of enzymes, or as a probe or indicator (when its fluorescence is affected by environmental aspects such as polarity or ions). More generally they are covalently bonded to macromolecules, serving as a markers (or dyes, or tags, or reporters) for affine or bioactive reagents (antibodies, peptides, nucleic acids). Fluorophores are notably used to stain tissues, cells, or materials in a variety of analytical methods, such as fluorescent imaging and spectroscopy.

Fluorescein, via its amine-reactive isothiocyanate derivative fluorescein isothiocyanate (FITC), has been one of the most popular fluorophores. From antibody labeling, the applications have spread to nucleic acids thanks to carboxyfluorescein. Other historically common fluorophores are derivatives of rhodamine (TRITC), coumarin, and cyanine. Newer generations of fluorophores, many of which are proprietary, often perform better, being more photostable, brighter, or less pH-sensitive than traditional dyes with comparable excitation and emission.

== Fluorescence ==
The fluorophore absorbs light energy of a specific wavelength and re-emits light at a longer wavelength. The absorbed wavelengths, energy transfer efficiency, and time before emission depend on both the fluorophore structure and its chemical environment, since the molecule in its excited state interacts with surrounding molecules. Wavelengths of maximum absorption (≈ excitation) and emission (for example, Absorption/Emission = 485 nm/517 nm) are the typical terms used to refer to a given fluorophore, but the whole spectrum may be important to consider. The excitation spectrum may be a very narrow or broader band, or it may be all beyond a cutoff level. The emission spectrum is usually sharper than the excitation spectrum, and it is of a longer wavelength and correspondingly lower energy. Excitation energies range from ultraviolet through the visible spectrum, and emission energies may continue from visible light into the near infrared region.

The main characteristics of fluorophores are:

- Maximum excitation and emission wavelength (expressed in nanometers (nm)): corresponds to the peak in the excitation and emission spectra (usually one peak each).
- Molar absorption coefficient (in mol^{−1}cm^{−1}): links the quantity of absorbed light, at a given wavelength, to the concentration of fluorophore in solution.
- Quantum yield: efficiency of the energy transferred from incident light to emitted fluorescence (the number of emitted photons per absorbed photons).
- Lifetime (in picoseconds): duration of the excited state of a fluorophore before returning to its ground state. It refers to the time taken for a population of excited fluorophores to decay to 1/e (≈0.368) of the original amount.
- Stokes shift: the difference between the maximum excitation and maximum emission wavelengths.
- Dark fraction: the proportion of the molecules not active in fluorescence emission. For quantum dots, prolonged single-molecule microscopy showed that 20-90% of all particles never emit fluorescence. On the other hand, conjugated polymer nanoparticles (Pdots) show almost no dark fraction in their fluorescence. Fluorescent proteins can have a dark fraction from protein misfolding or defective chromophore formation.

These characteristics drive other properties, including photobleaching or photoresistance (loss of fluorescence upon continuous light excitation). Other parameters should be considered, as the polarity of the fluorophore molecule, the fluorophore size and shape (i.e. for polarization fluorescence pattern), and other factors can change the behavior of fluorophores.

Fluorophores can also be used to quench the fluorescence of other fluorescent dyes or to relay their fluorescence at even longer wavelengths.

== Size (molecular weight) ==
Most fluorophores are organic small molecules of 20–100 atoms (200–1000 Dalton; the molecular weight may be higher depending on grafted modifications and conjugated molecules), but there are also much larger natural fluorophores that are proteins: green fluorescent protein (GFP) is 27 kDa, and several phycobiliproteins (PE, APC...) are ≈240kDa. As of 2020, the smallest known fluorophore was claimed to be 3-hydroxyisonicotinaldehyde, a compound of 14 atoms and only 123 Da.

Fluorescence particles like quantum dots (2–10 nm diameter, 100–100,000 atoms) are also considered fluorophores.

The size of the fluorophore might sterically hinder the tagged molecule and affect the fluorescence polarity.

== Families ==
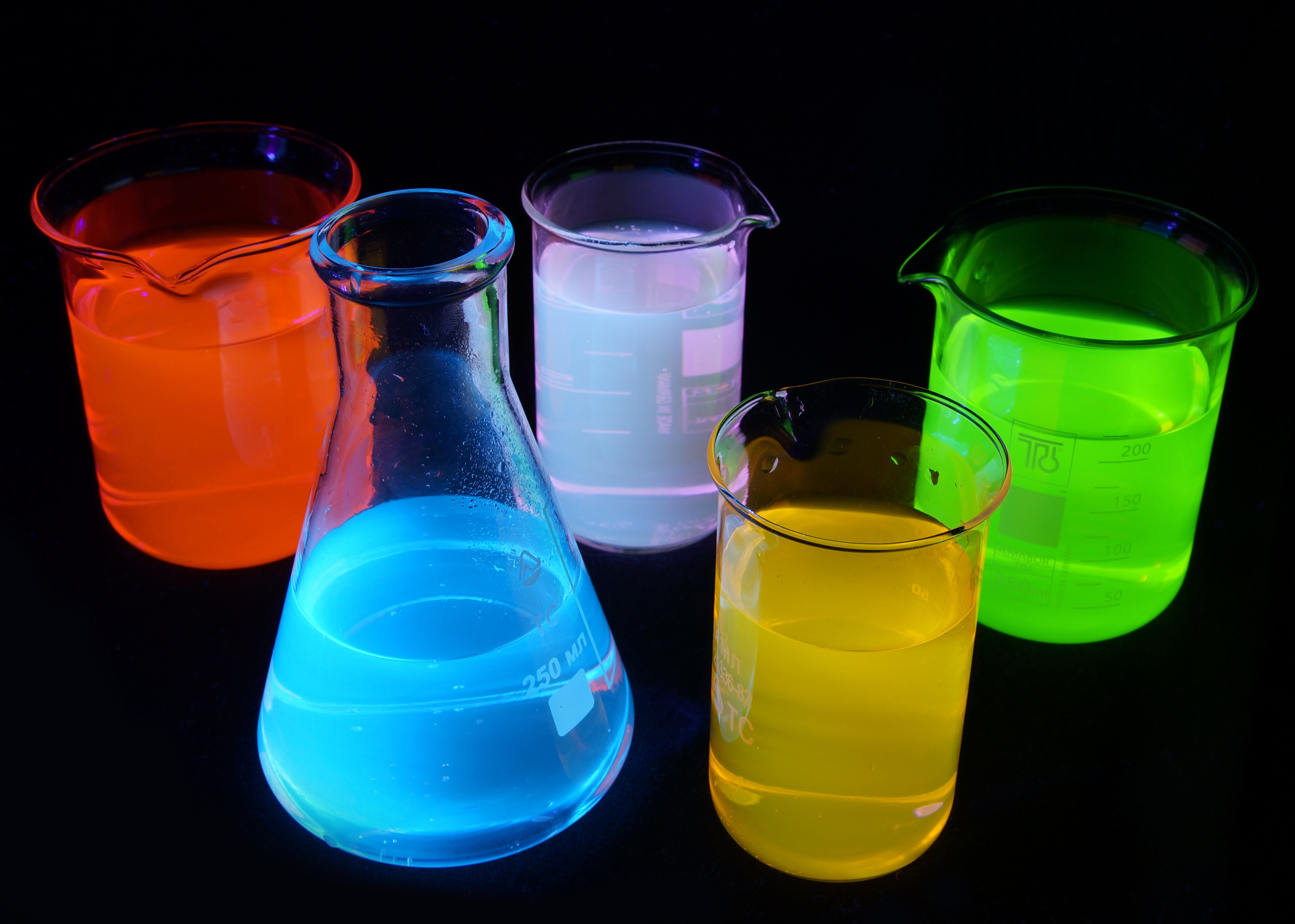
Fluorescence of different substances under UV light. Green is a fluorescein, red is Rhodamine B, yellow is Rhodamine 6G, blue is quinine, purple is a mixture of quinine and rhodamine 6g. Solutions are about 0.001% concentration in water.

Fluorophore molecules could be either utilized alone, or serve as a fluorescent motif of a functional system. Based on molecular complexity and synthetic methods, fluorophore molecules could be generally classified into four categories: proteins and peptides, small organic compounds, synthetic oligomers and polymers, and multi-component systems.

Fluorescent proteins GFP, YFP, and RFP (green, yellow, and red, respectively) can be attached to other specific proteins to form a fusion protein, synthesized in cells after transfection of a suitable plasmid carrier.

Non-protein organic fluorophores belong to following major chemical families:

- Xanthene derivatives: fluorescein, rhodamine, Oregon green, eosin, and Texas red
- Cyanine derivatives: cyanine, indocarbocyanine, oxacarbocyanine, thiacarbocyanine, and merocyanine
- Squaraine derivatives and ring-substituted squaraines, including Seta and Square dyes
- Squaraine rotaxane derivatives: See Tau dyes
- Naphthalene derivatives (dansyl and prodan derivatives)
- Coumarin derivatives
- Oxadiazole derivatives: pyridyloxazole, nitrobenzoxadiazole, and benzoxadiazole
- Anthracene derivatives: anthraquinones, including DRAQ5, DRAQ7, and CyTRAK Orange
- Pyrene derivatives: cascade blue, etc.
- Oxazine derivatives: Nile red, Nile blue, cresyl violet, oxazine 170, etc.
- Acridine derivatives: proflavin, acridine orange, acridine yellow, etc.
- Arylmethine derivatives: auramine, crystal violet, malachite green
- Tetrapyrrole derivatives: porphin, phthalocyanine, bilirubin
- Dipyrromethene derivatives: BODIPY, aza-BODIPY

These fluorophores fluoresce due to delocalized electrons which can jump a band and stabilize the energy absorbed. For example, benzene, one of the simplest aromatic hydrocarbons, is excited at 254 nm and emits at 300 nm. This discriminates fluorophores from quantum dots, which are fluorescent semiconductor nanoparticles.

They can be attached to proteins to specific functional groups, such as amino groups (active ester, carboxylate, isothiocyanate, hydrazine), carboxyl groups (carbodiimide), thiol (maleimide, acetyl bromide), and organic azide (via click chemistry or non-specifically (glutaraldehyde)).

Additionally, various functional groups can be present to alter their properties, such as solubility, or confer special properties, such as boronic acid which binds to sugars or multiple carboxyl groups to bind to certain cations. When the dye contains an electron-donating and an electron-accepting group at opposite ends of the aromatic system, this dye will probably be sensitive to the environment's polarity (solvatochromic), hence called environment-sensitive. Often dyes are used inside cells, which are impermeable to charged molecules; as a result of this, the carboxyl groups are converted into an ester, which is removed by esterases inside the cells, e.g., fura-2AM and fluorescein-diacetate.

The following dye families are trademark groups, and do not necessarily share structural similarities.

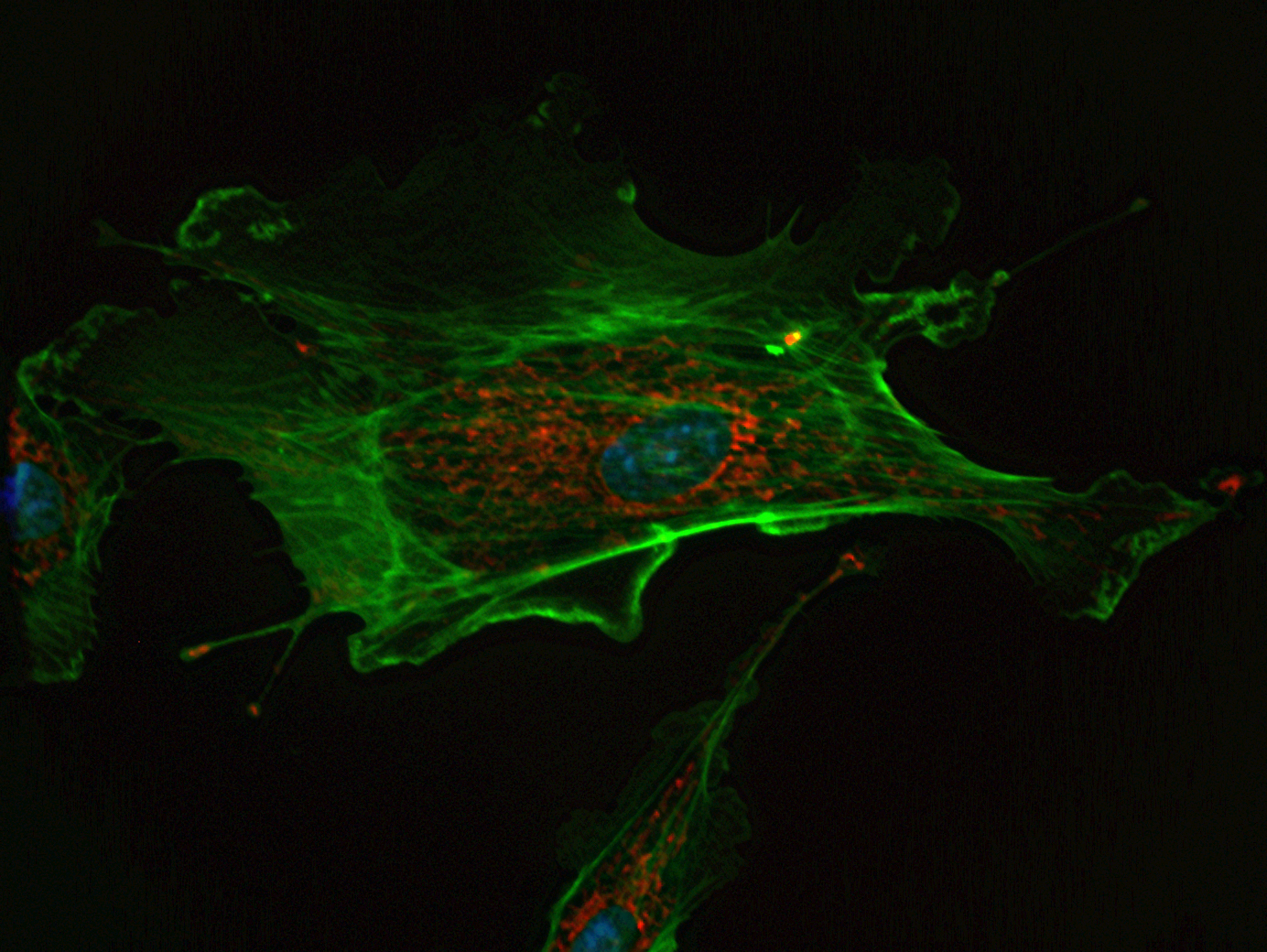
Bovine Pulmonary Artery Endothelial cell nuclei stained blue with DAPI, mitochondria stained red with MitoTracker Red CMXRos, and F-actin stained green with Alexa Fluor 488 phalloidin and imaged on a fluorescent microscope.

- CF dye (Biotium)
- DRAQ and CyTRAK probes (BioStatus)
- BODIPY (Invitrogen)
- EverFluor (Setareh Biotech)
- Alexa Fluor (Invitrogen)
- Bella Fluor (Setareh Biotech)
- DyLight Fluor (Thermo Scientific, Pierce)
- Atto (ATTO-TEC GmbH)
- Tracy (Sigma Aldrich)
- FluoProbes (Interchim)
- Abberior Dyes (Abberior)
- DY and MegaStokes Dyes (Dyomics)
- Sulfo Cy dyes (Cyandye)
- HiLyte Fluor (AnaSpec)
- Seta, SeTau and Square Dyes (SETA BioMedicals)
- Quasar and Cal Fluor dyes (Biosearch Technologies)
- SureLight Dyes (APC, RPEPerCP, Phycobilisomes) (Columbia Biosciences)
- APC, APCXL, RPE, BPE (Phyco-Biotech, Greensea, Prozyme, Flogen)
- Vio Dyes (Miltenyi Biotec)

== Examples of frequently encountered fluorophores ==
=== Reactive and conjugated dyes ===
Dye	Ex (nm)	Em (nm)	MW	Notes
Hydroxycoumarin	325	386	331	Succinimidyl ester
Aminocoumarin	350	445	330	Succinimidyl ester
Methoxycoumarin	360	410	317	Succinimidyl ester
Cascade Blue	(375);401	423	596	Hydrazide
Pacific Blue	403	455	406	Maleimide
Pacific Orange	403	551		
3-Hydroxyisonicotinaldehyde	385	525	123	QY 0.15; pH sensitive
Lucifer yellow	425	528		
NBD	466	539	294	NBD-X
R-Phycoerythrin (PE)	480;565	578	240 k	
PE-Cy5 conjugates	480;565;650	670		aka Cychrome, R670, Tri-Color, Quantum Red
PE-Cy7 conjugates	480;565;743	767		
Red 613	480;565	613		PE-Texas Red
PerCP	490	675	35kDa	Peridinin chlorophyll protein
TruRed	490,675	695		PerCP-Cy5.5 conjugate
FluorX	494	520	587	(GE Healthcare)
Fluorescein	495	519	389	FITC; pH sensitive
BODIPY-FL	503	512		
G-Dye100	498	524		suitable for protein labeling and electrophoresis
G-Dye200	554	575		suitable for protein labeling and electrophoresis
G-Dye300	648	663		suitable for protein labeling and electrophoresis
G-Dye400	736	760		suitable for protein labeling and electrophoresis
Cy2	489	506	714	QY 0.12
Cy3	(512);550	570;(615)	767	QY 0.15
Cy3B	558	572;(620)	658	QY 0.67
Cy3.5	581	594;(640)	1102	QY 0.15
Cy5	(625);650	670	792	QY 0.28
Cy5.5	675	694	1272	QY 0.23
Cy7	743	767	818	QY 0.28
TRITC	547	572	444	TRITC
X-Rhodamine	570	576	548	XRITC
Lissamine Rhodamine B	570	590		
Texas Red	589	615	625	Sulfonyl chloride
Allophycocyanin (APC)	650	660	104 k	
APC-Cy7 conjugates	650;755	767		Far Red

Abbreviations:

- Ex (nm): Excitation wavelength in nanometers
- Em (nm): Emission wavelength in nanometers
- MW: Molecular weight
- QY: Quantum yield

=== Nucleic acid dyes ===
Dye	Ex (nm)	Em (nm)	MW	Notes
Hoechst 33342	343	483	616	AT-selective
DAPI	345	455		AT-selective
Hoechst 33258	345	478	624	AT-selective
SYTOX Blue	431	480	~400	DNA
Chromomycin A3	445	575		CG-selective
Mithramycin	445	575		
YOYO-1	491	509	1271	
Ethidium Bromide	210;285	605	394	in aqueous solution
GelRed	290;520	595	1239	Non-toxic substitute for Ethidium Bromide
Acridine Orange	503	530/640		DNA/RNA
SYTOX Green	504	523	~600	DNA
TOTO-1, TO-PRO-1	509	533		Vital stain, TOTO: Cyanine Dimer
TO-PRO: Cyanine Monomer
Thiazole Orange	510	530		
CyTRAK Orange	520	615	-	(Biostatus) (red excitation dark)
Propidium Iodide (PI)	536	617	668.4	
LDS 751	543;590	712;607	472	DNA (543ex/712em), RNA (590ex/607em)
7-AAD	546	647		7-aminoactinomycin D, CG-selective
SYTOX Orange	547	570	~500	DNA
TOTO-3, TO-PRO-3	642	661		
DRAQ5	600/647	697	413	(Biostatus) (usable excitation down to 488)
DRAQ7	599/644	694	~700	(Biostatus) (usable excitation down to 488)

=== Cell function dyes ===
Dye	Ex (nm)	Em (nm)	MW	Notes
Indo-1	361/330	490/405	1010	AM ester, low/high calcium (Ca^{2+})
Fluo-3	506	526	855	AM ester. pH > 6
Fluo-4	491/494	516	1097	AM ester. pH 7.2
DCFH	505	535	529	2'7'Dichorodihydrofluorescein, oxidized form
DHR	505	534	346	Dihydrorhodamine 123, oxidized form, light catalyzes oxidation
SNARF	548/579	587/635		pH 6/9

=== Fluorescent proteins ===
Dye	Ex (nm)	Em (nm)	MW	QY	BR	PS	Notes
GFP (Y66H mutation)	360	442					
GFP (Y66F mutation)	360	508					
EBFP	380	440		0.18	0.27		monomer
EBFP2	383	448			20		monomer
Azurite	383	447			15		monomer
GFPuv	385	508					
T-Sapphire	399	511		0.60	26	25	weak dimer
Cerulean	433	475		0.62	27	36	weak dimer
mCFP	433	475		0.40	13	64	monomer
mTurquoise2	434	474		0.93	28		monomer
ECFP	434	477		0.15	3		
CyPet	435	477		0.51	18	59	weak dimer
GFP (Y66W mutation)	436	485					
mKeima-Red	440	620		0.24	3		monomer (MBL)
TagCFP	458	480			29		dimer (Evrogen)
AmCyan1	458	489		0.75	29		tetramer, (Clontech)
mTFP1	462	492			54		dimer
GFP (S65A mutation)	471	504					
Midoriishi Cyan	472	495		0.9	25		dimer (MBL)
Wild Type GFP	396,475	508	26k	0.77			
GFP (S65C mutation)	479	507					
TurboGFP	482	502	26 k	0.53	37		dimer, (Evrogen)
TagGFP	482	505			34		monomer (Evrogen)
GFP (S65L mutation)	484	510					
Emerald	487	509		0.68	39	0.69	weak dimer, (Invitrogen)
GFP (S65T mutation)	488	511					
EGFP	488	507	26k	0.60	34	174	weak dimer, (Clontech)
Azami Green	492	505		0.74	41		monomer (MBL)
ZsGreen1	493	505	105k	0.91	40		tetramer, (Clontech)
TagYFP	508	524			47		monomer (Evrogen)
EYFP	514	527	26k	0.61	51	60	weak dimer, (Clontech)
Topaz	514	527			57		monomer
Venus	515	528		0.57	53	15	weak dimer
mCitrine	516	529		0.76	59	49	monomer
YPet	517	530		0.77	80	49	weak dimer
TurboYFP	525	538	26 k	0.53	55.7		dimer, (Evrogen)
ZsYellow1	529	539		0.65	13		tetramer, (Clontech)
Kusabira Orange	548	559		0.60	31		monomer (MBL)
mOrange	548	562		0.69	49	9	monomer
Allophycocyanin (APC)	652	657.5	105 kDa	0.68			heterodimer, crosslinked
mKO	548	559		0.60	31	122	monomer
TurboRFP	553	574	26 k	0.67	62		dimer, (Evrogen)
tdTomato	554	581		0.69	95	98	tandem dimer
TagRFP	555	584			50		monomer (Evrogen)
DsRed monomer	556	586	~28k	0.1	3.5	16	monomer, (Clontech)
DsRed2 ("RFP")	563	582	~110k	0.55	24		(Clontech)
mStrawberry	574	596		0.29	26	15	monomer
TurboFP602	574	602	26 k	0.35	26		dimer, (Evrogen)
AsRed2	576	592	~110k	0.21	13		tetramer, (Clontech)
mRFP1	584	607	~30k	0.25			monomer, (Tsien lab)
J-Red	584	610		0.20	8.8	13	dimer
R-phycoerythrin (RPE)	565 >498	573	250 kDa	0.84			heterotrimer
B-phycoerythrin (BPE)	545	572	240 kDa	0.98			heterotrimer
mCherry	587	610		0.22	16	96	monomer
HcRed1	588	618	~52k	0.03	0.6		dimer, (Clontech)
Katusha	588	635			23		dimer
P3	614	662	~10,000 kDa				phycobilisome complex
Peridinin Chlorophyll (PerCP)	483	676	35 kDa				trimer
mKate (TagFP635)	588	635			15		monomer (Evrogen)
TurboFP635	588	635	26 k	0.34	22		dimer, (Evrogen)
mPlum	590	649	51.4 k	0.10	4.1	53	
mRaspberry	598	625		0.15	13		monomer, faster photobleach than mPlum
mScarlet	569	594		0.70	71	277	monomer

== Applications ==
Fluorophores have particular importance in the field of biochemistry and protein studies, for example, in immunofluorescence, cell analysis, immunohistochemistry, and small molecule sensors.

=== Fluorescent polymers ===
Fluorophores have been used with polymers in different ways and for many types of applications in different fields such as biochemistry, analytical chemistry, material science, and nanochemistry. For example, peptide-RAFT agents tagged with 5,6-carboxyfluorescein have been used to synthesize polyacrylamide, polyacrylate and polystyrene with possible applications for analysis of cellular uptake of different sized polymers. Fluorescent polyolefins, such as fluorescent polyethylene, have been synthesized and explored as materials due to their possible applications in fluorescent probes, LEDs, information storage and encryption devices, cell imaging, plastic sorting, and quantification of recycled plastic.

== Uses outside the life sciences ==
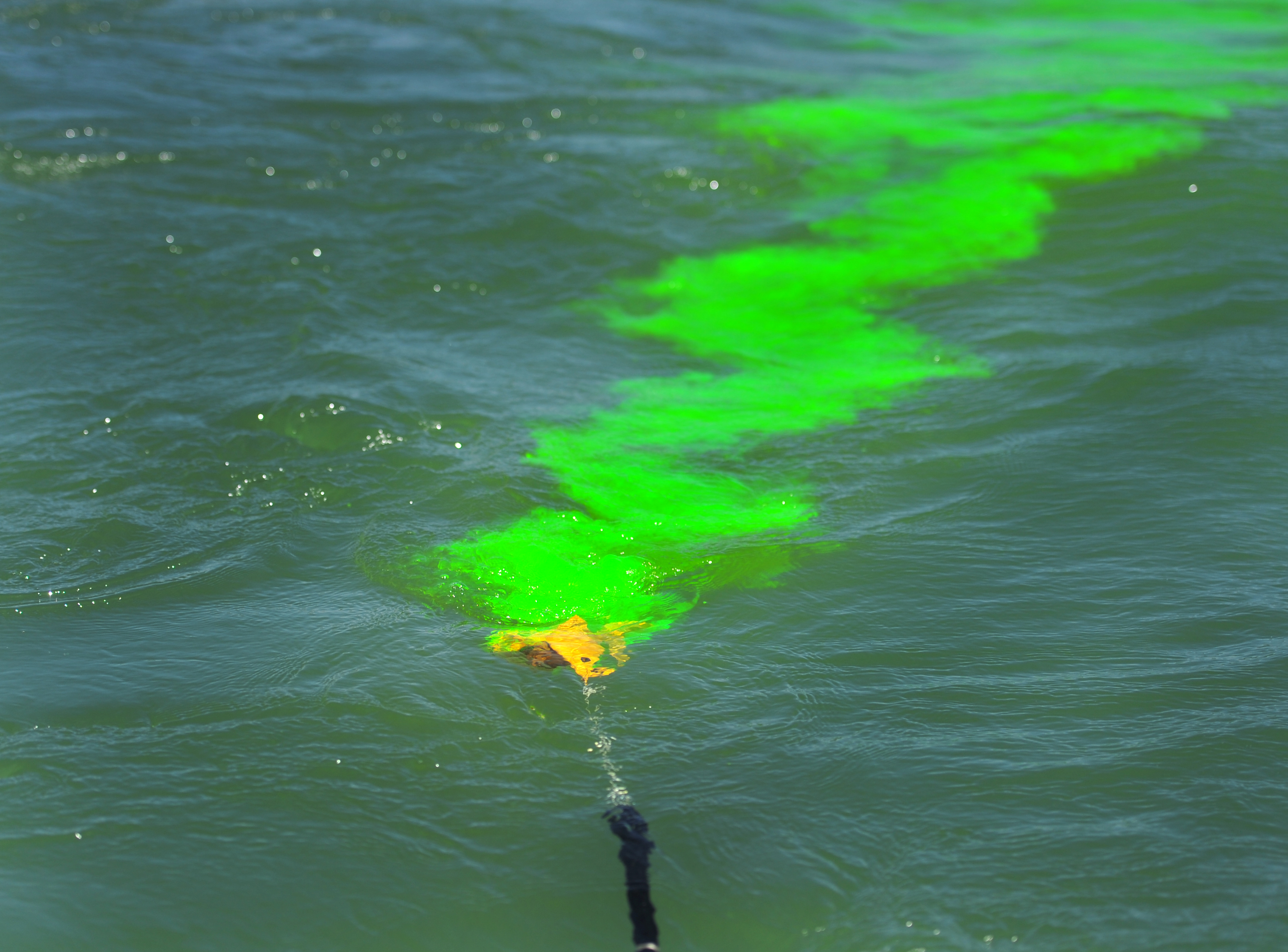
Fluorescent sea dye

Fluorescent dyes find a wide use in industry, going under the name of "neon colors", such as:

- Multi-ton scale usages in textile dyeing and optical brighteners in laundry detergents
- Advanced cosmetic formulations
- Safety equipment and clothing
- Organic light-emitting diodes (OLEDs)
- Fine arts and design (posters and paintings)
- Synergists for insecticides and experimental drugs
- Dyes in highlighters to give off a glow-like effect
- Solar panels to collect more light / wavelengths
- Fluorescent sea dye is used to help airborne search and rescue teams locate objects in the water

== See also ==
- Category:Fluorescent dyes
- Fluorescence in the life sciences
- Quenching of fluorescence
- Fluorescence recovery after photobleaching (FRAP) - an application for quantifying mobility of molecules in lipid bilayers.
