= BODIPY =

Parent chemical compound of certain fluorescent dyes

- BODIPY (unsubstituted)

Names
- Preferred IUPAC name 5,5-Difluoro-5H-4λ^{5}-dipyrrolo[1,2-c:2′,1′-f][1,3,2]diazaborinin-4-ylium-5-uide
- Other names Dipyrrometheneboron difluoride

Identifiers
CAS Number	138026-71-8
3D model (JSmol)	Interactive image
Beilstein Reference	8139995
ChEBI	CHEBI:51107
ChEMBL	ChEMBL3343406
ChemSpider	19572352
PubChem CID	25058173
UNII	8X7LUT95FD
- InChI: InChI=1S/C9H7BF2N2/c11-10(12)13-5-1-3-8(13)7-9-4-2-6-14(9)10/h1-7H Key: GUHHEAYOTAJBPT-UHFFFAOYSA-N
- SMILES: [B-]1(N2C=CC=C2C=C3[N+]1=CC=C3)(F)F

Properties
Chemical formula	C_{9}H_{7}BF_{2}N_{2}
Molar mass	191.98 g/mol
Appearance	red crystalline solid
Melting point	450 °C
Solubility	methanol, dichloromethane
- Except where otherwise noted, data are given for materials in their standard state (at 25 °C [77 °F], 100 kPa). Infobox references

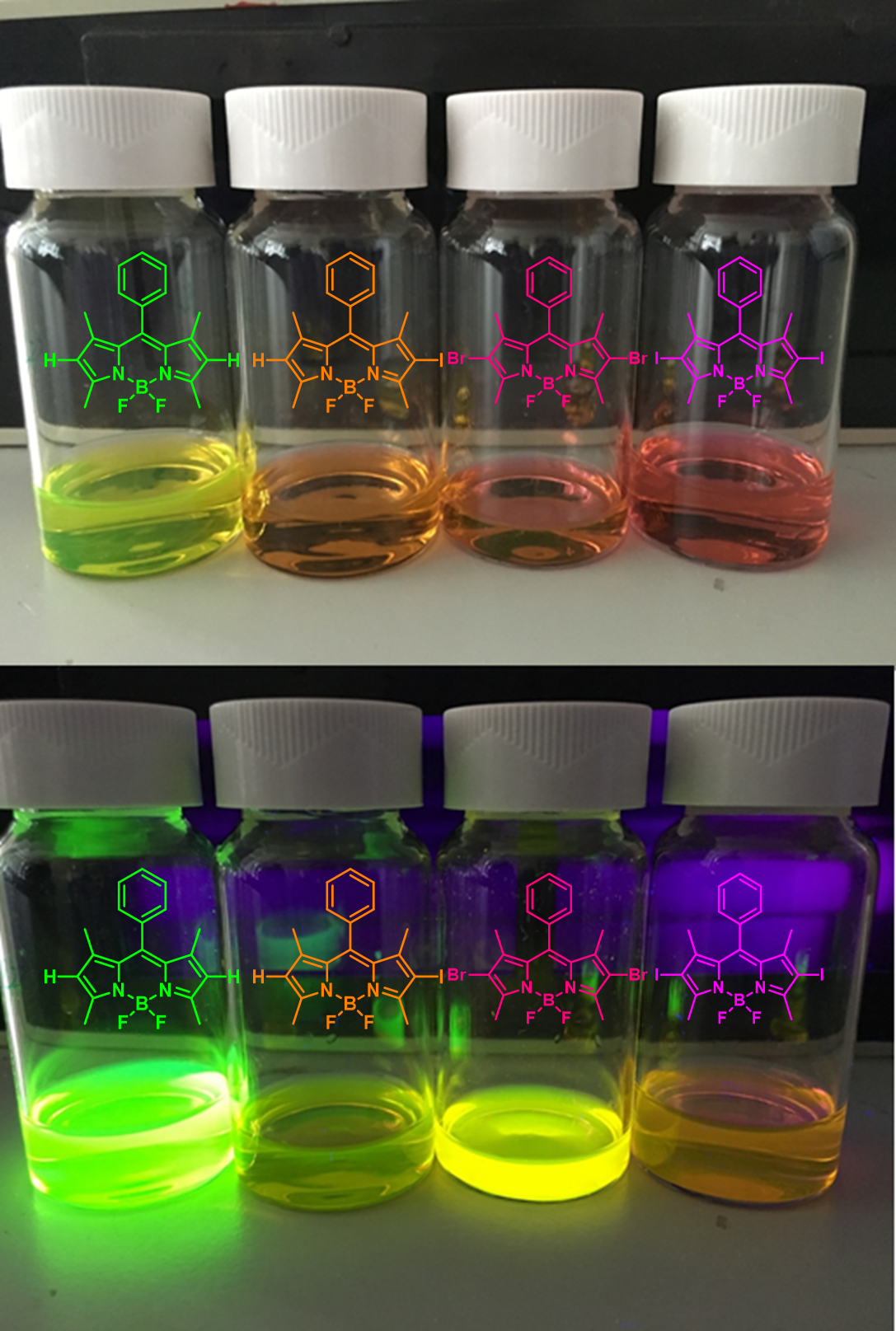
Samples of halogenated BODIPY dyes in ambient lighting and fluorescing under UV

BODIPY (boron–dipyrromethene) is the technical common name of a chemical compound with formula C_{9}H_{7}BN_{2}F_{2}, whose molecule consists of a boron difluoride group BF_{2} joined to a dipyrromethene group C_{9}H_{7}N_{2}; specifically, the compound 4,4-difluoro-4-bora-3a,4a-diaza-s-indacene in the IUPAC nomenclature. It is a red crystalline solid, stable at ambient temperature, soluble in methanol.

The compound itself was isolated only in 2009, but many derivatives—formally obtained by replacing one or more hydrogen atoms by other functional groups—have been known since 1968, and comprise the important class of BODIPY dyes. These organoboron compounds have attracted much interest as fluorescent dyes and markers in biological research, as well as gain media in solid-state dye lasers.

== Structure ==
In its crystalline solid form, the core BODIPY is almost, but not entirely, planar and symmetrical; except for the two fluorine atoms, that lie on the perpendicular bisecting plane. Its bonding can be explained by assuming a formal negative charge on the boron atom, and a formal positive charge on one of the nitrogen atoms.

== Synthesis ==
BODIPY and its derivatives can be obtained by reacting the corresponding 2,2'-dipyrromethene derivatives with boron trifluoride-diethyl ether complex (BF_{3}·(C_{2}H_{5})_{2}O) in the presence of triethylamine or 1,8-diazabicyclo[5.4.0]undec-7-ene (DBU). The difficulty of the synthesis was due to instability of the usual dipyrromethene precursor, rather than of BODIPY itself.

The dipyrromethene precursors are accessed from a suitable pyrrole derivatives by several methods. Normally, one alpha-position in employed pyrroles is substituted and the other is free. Condensation of such pyrrole, often available from Knorr pyrrole synthesis, with an aromatic aldehyde in the presence of trifluoroacetic acid gives dipyrromethane, which is oxidized to dipyrromethene using a quinone oxidant such as DDQ or p-chloranil.

Alternatively, dipyrromethenes are prepared by treating a pyrrole with an activated carboxylic acid derivative, usually an acyl chloride. Unsymmetrical dipyrromethenes can be obtained by condensing pyrroles with 2-acylpyrroles. Intermediate dipyrromethanes may be isolated and purified, but isolation of dipyrromethenes is usually compromised by their instability.

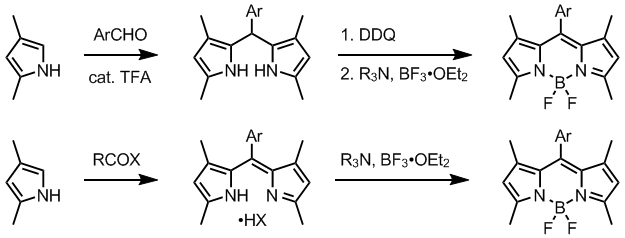

== Derivatives ==
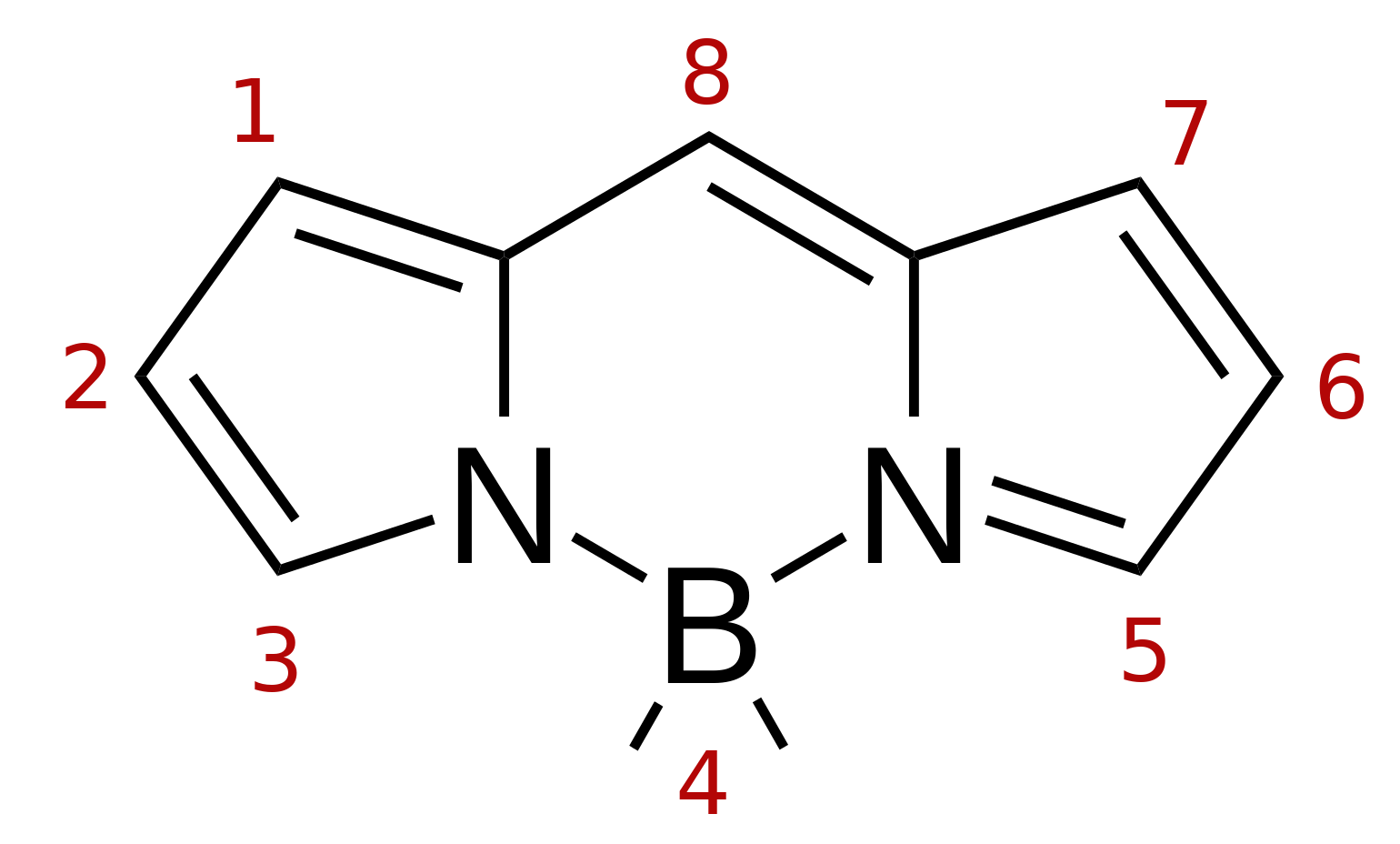
IUPAC atom numbering for substitutions on the BODIPY core. Positions 3 and 5 are also commonly called "α"; 1,2,6,7 are called "β"; and 8 is called "meso". Note that the numbering does not match the numbering on the parent 2,2'-dipyrromethene molecule.

The general structure of pyrromethene dyes, abbreviated with "P". For instance, for P500, R^{1}=R^{2}=CH_{3}.

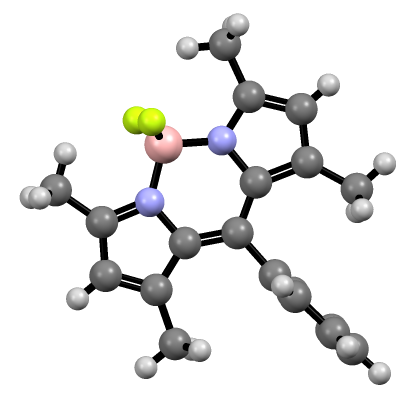
Molecular structure of 1,3,5,7-tetramethyl-8-phenyl-substituted BODIPY.

The BODIPY core has a rich derivative chemistry due to the high tolerance for substitutions in the pyrrole and aldehyde (or acyl chloride) starting materials. Derivatization and functionalization of BODIPY dyes is complicated by the BODIPY core's sensitivity to strongly acidic or strongly basic conditions. This pH sensitivity is dependent on what substituents are present at boron. Acid-promoted degradation of BODIPY dyes occurs via deboronation of the BODIPY core.

Hydrogen atoms at the 2 and 6 positions of the cyclic core can be displaced by halogen atoms using succinimide reagents such as NCS, NBS and NIS - which allows for further post-functionalisation through palladium coupling reactions with boronate esters, tin reagents etc. The α-methyl (positions 3 and 5) of a BODIPY has partial nucleophilic character and can be readily brominated with NBS.

The two fluorine atoms on the boron atom can be replaced, during or after synthesis, by other strong nucleophilic reagents, such as lithiated alkyne or aryl species, chlorine, methoxy, or a divalent "strap". The reaction is catalysed by BBr_{3} or SnCl_{4}.

== Fluorescence ==
BODIPY and many of its derivatives have received attention recently for being fluorescent dyes with unique properties. They strongly absorb UV-radiation and re-emit it in very narrow frequency spreads, with high quantum yields, mostly at wavelengths below 600 nm. They are relatively insensitive to the polarity and pH of their environment and are reasonably stable to physiological conditions. Small modifications to their structures enable tuning of their fluorescence characteristics. BODIPY dyes are relatively chemically inert. Fluorescence is quenched in a solution, which limits application. This problem has been handled by synthesizing asymmetric boron complexes and replacing the fluorine groups with phenyl groups.

The unsubstituted BODIPY has a broad absorption band, from about 420 to 520 nm (peaking at 503 nm) and a broad emission band from about 480 to 580 nm (peaking at 512 nm), with a fluorescence lifetime of 7.2 ns. Its fluorescence quantum yield is near 1, greater than that of substituted BODIPY dyes and comparable to those of rhodamine and fluorescein, but fluorescence is lost above 50 °C.

BODIPY dyes are notable for their uniquely small Stokes shift, high, environment-independent fluorescence quantum yields, often approaching 100% even in water, sharp excitation and emission peaks contributing to overall brightness, and high solubility in many organic solvents. The combination of these qualities makes BODIPY fluorophores promising for imaging applications. The position of the absorption and emission bands remain almost unchanged in solvents of different polarity as the change of permanent dipole moment upon excitation is small.

== Potential applications ==
The advantages of BODIPY are their low photodegradation, low toxicity and polarity, high biocompatibility, charge neutrality, and high fluorescence quantum yield, all of which make BODIPY effective markers. BODIPY conjugates are widely studied as potential sensors and for labelling biomolecules and cellular compartments (e.g. cell organelles) by exploiting its highly tunable optoelectronic properties. BODIPY dyes functionalized at the meso-methyl position (analogous to the benzylic position) are commonly used as photocages that release cargo via an S_{N}1-like photoheterolysis mechanism. Photorelease quantum yield from BODIPY photocages can be enhanced via the heavy atom effect.

Numerous BODIPY derivatives are being investigated as electroactive species for single-substance redox flow batteries. In recent years, BODIPY derivatives are also being explored as photosensitizers for applications in photodynamic therapy and photocatalysis.

== See also ==
- Azadipyrromethene
