= Pacific Blue =

Pacific Blue may refer to:

- Pacific Blue (company) (formerly Pacific Hydro), renewable energy company in Australia
- Pacific Blue (TV series)
- Pacific blue, a shade of azure manufactured by the Crayola company
- Pacific Blue (dye), a dye used in cell biology
- Virgin Australia Airlines (NZ) and Virgin Australia operated under brand Pacific Blue Airlines in New Zealand between 2003 and 2014
