= C6H7NO2 =

The molecular formula C_{6}H_{7}NO_{2} (molar mass: 125.125 g/mol, exact mass: 125.0477 u) may refer to:

- Ethyl cyanoacrylate (ECA)
- 3-Hydroxyisonicotinaldehyde (HINA)
- N-Ethylmaleimide (NEM)
