= 2,2'-Dipyrromethene =

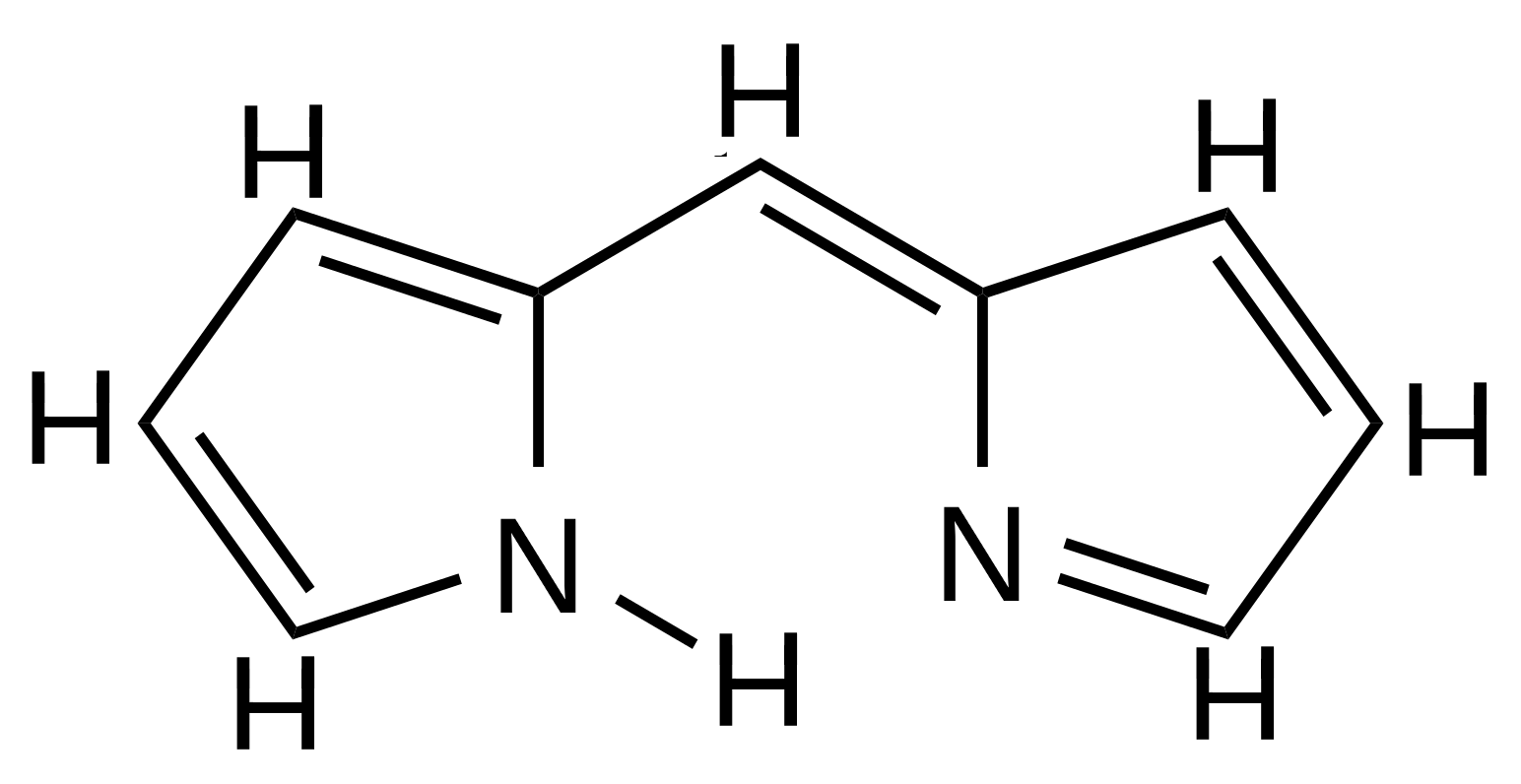
- Schematic formula of the dipyrromethene molecule.

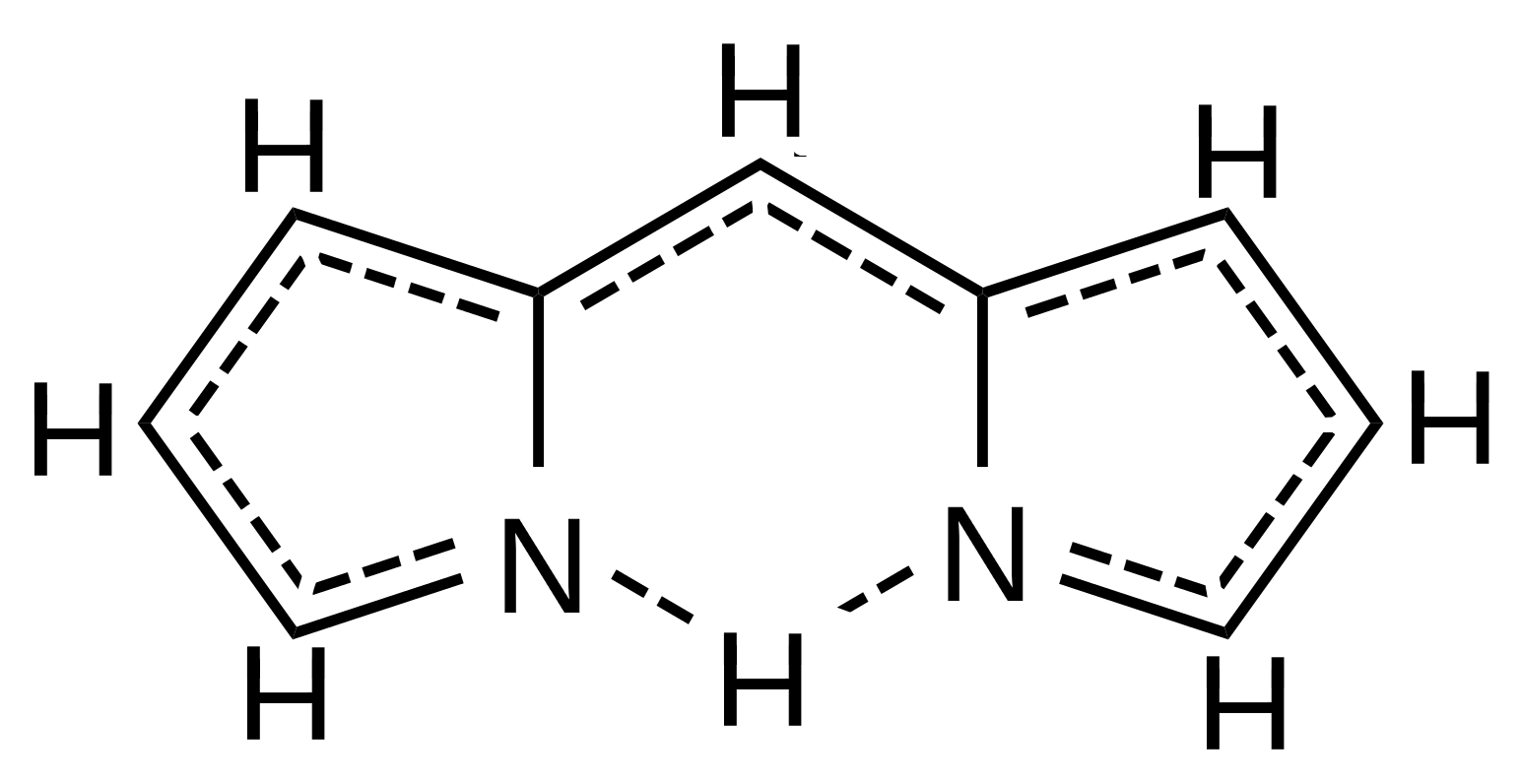
- Schematic formula of dipyrromethene (fractional bonding view).

Names
- Preferred IUPAC name 2-[(2H-Pyrrol-2-ylidene)methyl]-1H-pyrrole
- Other names dipyrrin, pyrromethene, dipyrromethene

Identifiers
3D model (JSmol)	Interactive image
ChEBI	CHEBI:36318
ChemSpider	2340640
PubChem CID	3083424
CompTox Dashboard (EPA)	DTXSID301336447
- InChI: InChI=1S/C9H8N2/c1-3-8(10-5-1)7-9-4-2-6-11-9/h1-7,10H Key: OVTCUIZCVUGJHS-UHFFFAOYSA-N
- SMILES: c1cc([nH]c1)C=C2C=CC=N2

Properties
Chemical formula	C_{9}H_{8}N_{2}
Molar mass	144.177 g·mol^{−1}
- Except where otherwise noted, data are given for materials in their standard state (at 25 °C [77 °F], 100 kPa). Infobox references

2,2'-Dipyrromethene, often called just dipyrromethene or dipyrrin, is a chemical compound with formula C_{9}H_{8}N_{2} whose skeleton can be described as two pyrrole rings C_{4}N connected by a methyne bridge =CH– through their nitrogen-adjacent (position-2) carbons; the remaining bonds being satisfied by hydrogen atoms. It is an unstable compound that is readily attacked by nucleophilic compounds above −40 °C.

2,2'-Dipyrromethene and its more stable and easily prepared derivatives—formally obtained by replacing one or more hydrogen atoms by other functional groups—are important precursors for the family of BODIPY fluorescent dies. The derivatives include salts of the dipyrrinato anion C_{9}H_{7}N^{–}_{2} and of the cation C_{9}H_{9}N^{+}_{2}.

== Preparation ==
2,2'-Dipyrromethene and its derivatives can be obtained from suitable pyrrole derivatives by several methods.

The unsubstituted compound can be prepared by oxidation of 2,2'-dipyrrolemethane with 2,3-dichloro-5,6-dicyano-1,4-benzoquinone (DDQ) at −78 °C in dry dichloromethane solution. An alternative synthesis that avoids the oxidation step is the condensation of 2-formyl pyrrole and pyrrole catalyzed by trifluoroacetic acid, followed by deprotonation with N,N-diisopropylethylamine.

More generally, one starts with a pyrrole with suitable substituents at positions 3, 4, or 5 (but not 2). Condensation of two such molecules at their 2 positions with a bridging compound gives the corresponding 2,2'-dipyrromethane. The condensation may use, for example, the Knorr pyrrole synthesis, with an aromatic aldehyde in the presence of TFA. The dipyrromethane core is then oxidized to dipyrromethene using a quinone oxidant such as DDQ or p-chloranil.

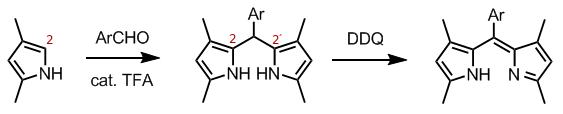

Alternatively, one may use an activated carboxylic acid derivative, usually an acyl chloride. As another possibility, one may condense a substituted pyrroles with a 2-acylpyrrole; this route allows the synthesis of unsymmetrical dipyrromethenes.

== Reactions ==
Dipyrrin is unstable above −40 °C. However, its acts as a base, and its chloride [C_{9}H_{9}N^{+}_{2}] [Cl^{−}] is sufficiently stable in solution.

The so-called BODIPY dyes can be obtained by reacting 2,2'-dipyrromethene or its derivatives with boron trifluoride-diethyl ether complex (BF_{3}·(C_{2}H_{5})_{2}O) in the presence of triethylamine or 1,8-diazabicyclo[5.4.0]undec-7-ene (DBU).

Dipyrrin and its derivatives for coordination complexes with transition metals. For example, the derivative anion 5-phenyl dipirrinato (pdp) forms the neutral iron(III) complex Fe(pdp)_{3} (dark green monoclinic crystals, soluble in benzene, orange solution in dichloromethane), where the Fe^{3+} ion is coordinated to six nitrogen atoms of the dipyrrin cores in distorted octahedral geometry. A similar cobalt(III) complex has also been reported, as well as a complex with copper(II) Cu(pdp)_{2}
