= BHQ =

BHQ may refer to:

- BHQ, IATA code for Broken Hill Airport in Broken Hill, New South Wales, Australia
- Bodyguard Headquarters (BHQ), an elite unit within the Royal Cambodian Armed Forces.
- Biblia Hebraica Quinta, fifth edition of the Biblia Hebraica, a scholarly version of the Old Testament
- bhq, ISO 639-3 code for the southern dialect of the Tukang Besi language, spoken in Sulawesi, Indonesia
- A type of dark quencher manufactured by Biosearch Technologies
