= Seminaphtharhodafluor =

Names
- Other names Seminaphtharhodafluorescein; Seminaphthorhodafluor

Identifiers
CAS Number	153967-04-5
3D model (JSmol)	Interactive image
ChemSpider	57539163
PubChem CID	71308270
UNII	8D95ED7EFQ
CompTox Dashboard (EPA)	DTXSID80745447
- InChI: InChI=1S/C24H15NO4/c25-14-6-10-19-21(12-14)28-22-16-8-7-15(26)11-13(16)5-9-20(22)24(19)18-4-2-1-3-17(18)23(27)29-24/h1-12,26H,25H2 Key: DYPYMMHZGRPOCK-UHFFFAOYSA-N
- SMILES: O=C(O1)C2=C(C=CC=C2)C31C4=CC=C(N)C=C4OC5=C3C=CC6=C5C=CC(O)=C6

Properties
Chemical formula	C_{24}H_{15}NO_{4}
Molar mass	381.387 g·mol^{−1}
- Except where otherwise noted, data are given for materials in their standard state (at 25 °C [77 °F], 100 kPa). Infobox references

Seminaphtharhodafluor or SNARF is a fluorescent dye that changes color with pH. It can be used to construct optical biosensors that use enzymes that change pH.

The absorption peak of the derivative carboxy-SNARF at pH 6.0 is at wavelength (515 and) 550 nm, while that at pH 9.0 is at 575 nm.

The emission peak of carboxy-SNARF at pH 6.0 is at wavelength 585 nm, while that at pH 9.0 is at 640 nm.

SNARF-1 can serve as a substrate for the MRP1 (multidrug resistance-associated protein-1) drug transporter, to measure the activity of the MRP1 transporter. For this purpose, an acetomethoxyester group is added to SNARF-1. Cellular esterases cleave off SNARF-1, and its transport out of the cells can be measured by following the loss of fluorescence from the cells.
