= CF dye =

Fluorophore life sciences reagent

CF dyes (trademarked as CF Dyes by Biotium) are a class of fluorescent dyes developed for biological research applications, including fluorescence microscopy, flow cytometry, and in vivo imaging. First introduced in the late 2000s, these dyes are characterized by a chemical strategy combining pegylation with sulfonation to achieve high water solubility while minimizing non-specific binding.

Varieties include 42 fluorophores spanning excitation wavelengths from 347 nm (ultraviolet) to 876 nm (near-infrared), built on four core chemical scaffolds: coumarin, pyrene, rhodamine, and cyanine. These dyes have been used in super-resolution microscopy, where several variants have been validated for techniques including STORM, MINFLUX, and STED microscopy.

== History and development ==
Development began around 2007 in response to limitations observed in existing commercial fluorophores, particularly the tendency of heavily sulfonated dyes to exhibit non-specific binding to positively charged cellular components. To address these issues, researchers developed a design strategy combining sulfonation with polyethylene glycol (PEG) modification, the details of which are described in a 2014 U.S. patent.

In 2009, researchers reported the development of a rhodamine–imidazole substitution strategy in which the benzene ring commonly used for conjugation was replaced with an imidazolium group. This modification produced a red shift in emission wavelength while preserving the photostability of the rhodamine xanthene core, extending the usable spectral range of rhodamine dyes toward the near-infrared region.

In 2022, a collaboration with researchers at UC Berkeley yielded CF583R and CF597R, which are rhodamine-based dyes optimized for STORM microscopy.

== Chemistry ==
CF dyes are synthesized through chemical modifications of established coumarin, rhodamine, and cyanine dye scaffolds. The dyes employ a dual strategy of sulfonation and pegylation. Sulfonation introduces sulfonate groups (–SO₃⁻) to improve water solubility, while pegylation adds polyethylene glycol (PEG) chains that sterically shield charged groups and reduce dye aggregation.

The PEG moieties inhibit π-stacking between adjacent dye molecules, reducing H-aggregate formation. H-aggregation is a cause of fluorescence quenching when multiple dye molecules are attached to a single antibody, limiting the useful degree of labeling (DOL) in antibody conjugates.

Rhodamine-based near-infrared CF dyes (designated with an "R" suffix) utilize rhodamine–imidazole substitution chemistry, as described in Wang et al. (2022), to extend emission wavelengths beyond the traditional ~600 nm limit while retaining the photostability characteristic of the rhodamine scaffold. The rigid xanthene core of rhodamines confers resistance to photobleaching relative to the flexible polymethine bridge found in cyanine dyes.

== Applications ==
Applications include immunofluorescence microscopy, flow cytometry, western blotting, in vivo imaging, fluorescence in situ hybridization, expansion microscopy, and apoptosis detection.

=== Super-resolution microscopy ===
The dyes have been evaluated in peer-reviewed studies for use in super-resolution microscopy techniques. A systematic evaluation of 28 commercial dyes by Lehmann and colleagues (2016) identified CF647 and CF680 as an optimal dye pair for spectral demixing-based, registration-free multicolor dSTORM in combination with CF568, due to low spectral crosstalk. CF583R and CF597R enable localization precision of approximately 10 nm laterally and 20 nm axially.

Research from Diekmann and colleagues at EMBL demonstrated that CF660C exhibits photostability during extended imaging sessions, enabling acquisition of approximately one million frames covering entire mitotic cells (40 × 40 × 6 μm volumes). CF640R and CF680R have been validated for stimulated emission depletion (STED) microscopy. Several dyes have been employed in structured illumination microscopy (SIM). CF660C and CF680 have been validated for MINFLUX nanoscopy using standard GLOX+MEA photoswitching buffers.

=== Representative spectral and validation data ===
Spectral properties and reported super-resolution validations for selected CF dyes
Dye	Ex (nm)	Em (nm)	ε (M⁻¹cm⁻¹)	Notes
CF350	347	448	18,000	UV excitable
CF405S	404	431	33,000	405 nm excitable
CF405M	408	452	41,000	405 nm excitable
CF405L	395	545	24,000	405 nm excitable, large Stokes shift
CF430	426	498	40,000	405 nm excitable, green emission
CF440	440	515	40,000	405 nm excitable, green emission
CF450	450	538	40,000	
CF488A	490	515	70,000	Validated for STORM, TIRF
CF503R	503	542	90,000	
CF514	514	~530	105,000	
CF532	532	~550	96,000	
CF535ST	535	568	95,000	Rhodamine-based; designed for STORM
CF543	543	~560	100,000	
CF550R	550	~570	100,000	
CF555	555	565	150,000	
CF568	562	583	100,000	Validated for STORM
CF570	570	~590	150,000	
CF583	583	606	150,000	
CF583R	586	609	100,000	Rhodamine-based; validated for STORM
CF594	593	614	115,000	
CF597R	597	619	115,000	Validated for STORM
CF620R	620	~642	115,000	
CF633	630	~650	100,000	
CF640R	642	662	105,000	Rhodamine-based; validated for STED
CF647	650	665	240,000	Validated for STORM
CF647Plus	652	668	240,000	
CF660C	667	685	200,000	Validated for STORM, MINFLUX
CF660R	660	682	100,000	Rhodamine-based
CF680	681	698	210,000	Validated for STORM
CF680R	680	701	140,000	Rhodamine-based; validated for STED
CF700	696	~719	240,000	
CF710	712	736	115,000	
CF725	729	750	120,000	
CF740	~740	~760	105,000	Rhodamine-based
CF750	755	777	250,000	Validated for STORM
CF770	770	797	220,000	
CF790	784	806	210,000	
CF800	797	816	210,000	
CF820	822	835	253,000	
CF850	852	870	—	
CF870	876	896	—	
RPE-Astral™616	496, 546, 566	617	—	FRET tandem dye for flow cytometry
RPE-Astral™775	496, 546, 565	774	—	FRET tandem dye for flow cytometry
APC-Astral™813	633, 638	813	—	FRET tandem dye for flow cytometry

== Patents ==
Key patents covering CF Dye technology include US8709830B2 ("Fluorescent dyes, fluorescent dye kits, and methods of preparing labeled molecules"), EP2223086B1 (priority date 2007), and international application WO2012129128A1.

== See also ==
- Fluorophore
- Fluorescence microscopy
- Super-resolution microscopy
