= NBD-TMA =

Names
- Preferred IUPAC name N,N,N-Trimethyl-2-[(7-nitro-2,1,3-benzoxadiazol-4-yl)amino]ethan-1-aminium

Identifiers
CAS Number	287970-46-1
3D model (JSmol)	Interactive image
ChemSpider	21106456
PubChem CID	53742778
UNII	9FG884CR6X
CompTox Dashboard (EPA)	DTXSID401027019
- InChI: InChI=1S/C11H16N5O3/c1-16(2,3)7-6-12-8-4-5-9(15(17)18)11-10(8)13-19-14-11/h4-5,12H,6-7H2,1-3H3/q+1 Key: CVUNMBFLPVSENX-UHFFFAOYSA-N; InChI=1/C11H16N5O3/c1-16(2,3)7-6-12-8-4-5-9(15(17)18)11-10(8)13-19-14-11/h4-5,12H,6-7H2,1-3H3/q+1 Key: CVUNMBFLPVSENX-UHFFFAOYAY
- SMILES: C[N+](C)(C)CCNc1ccc(c2c1non2)[N+](=O)[O-]

Properties
Chemical formula	C_{11}H_{16}N_{5}O_{3}^{+}
Molar mass	266.280 g·mol^{−1}
- Except where otherwise noted, data are given for materials in their standard state (at 25 °C [77 °F], 100 kPa). Infobox references

NBD-TMA (2-(4-nitro-2,1,3-benzoxadiazol-7-yl)aminoethyl]trimethylammonium) is a small, positively charged (+1) fluorescent dye. It was also known as EAM-1 (N,N,N,-trimethyl-2[(7-nitro-2,1,3-benzoxadiazol-4-yl)amino]ethanaminium iodide) when it was briefly supplied by Macrocyclics Company as an iodide complex.

NBD-TMA has an excitation maximum at 458 nm and an emission maximum at 530 nm. It also has a smaller local excitation maximum around 343 nm. The molar extinction coefficient is about 13,000 cm^{−1}M^{−1} and its overall effective fluorescence is about 1% that of fluorescein. It is only mildly sensitive to halide ion collision quenching.

NBD-TMA was designed as a probe for monitoring renal transport of organic cations. As a small, positively charged fluorophore, it has also seen use as a tracer for measuring gap junction coupling in cases of cation selective connexin channels.
