= YOYO-1 =

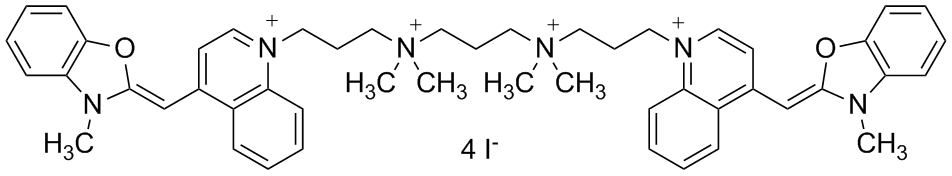

Names
- Preferred IUPAC name [1^{2}(2)Z,16(17^{2})Z]-1^{3},7,7,11,11,17^{3}-Hexamethyl-1^{3}H,17^{3}H-7,11-diaza-3^{1}λ^{5},15^{1}λ^{5}-3(4,1),15(1,4)-diquinolina-1,17(2)-bis([1,3]benzoxazola)heptadecaphane-1^{2}(2),16(17^{2})-diene-7,11-diium-3^{1},15^{1}-bis(ylium) tetraiodide
- Other names YOYO, YOYO-1, YoYo-1

Identifiers
CAS Number	143413-85-8
3D model (JSmol)	Interactive image
ChEBI	CHEBI:52947
ChemSpider	4942629
PubChem CID	6438136
UNII	1B34829IG0
CompTox Dashboard (EPA)	DTXSID801030161
- InChI: InChI=1S/C49H58N6O2.4HI/c1-50-44-22-11-13-24-46(44)56-48(50)36-38-26-30-52(42-20-9-7-18-40(38)42)28-15-32-54(3,4)34-17-35-55(5,6)33-16-29-53-31-27-39(41-19-8-10-21-43(41)53)37-49-51(2)45-23-12-14-25-47(45)57-49;;;;/h7-14,18-27,30-31,36-37H,15-17,28-29,32-35H2,1-6H3;4*1H/q+4;;;;/p-4 Key: GRRMZXFOOGQMFA-UHFFFAOYSA-J
- SMILES: CN\1c2ccccc2O/C1=C/c3cc[n+](c4c3cccc4)CCC[N+](C)(C)CCC[N+](C)(C)CCC[n+]5ccc(c6c5cccc6)/C=C\7/N(c8ccccc8O7)C.[I-].[I-].[I-].[I-]

Properties
Chemical formula	C_{49}H_{58}I_{4}N_{6}O_{2}
Molar mass	1270.642 g/mol
- Except where otherwise noted, data are given for materials in their standard state (at 25 °C [77 °F], 100 kPa). Infobox references

YOYO-1 is a green fluorescent dye used in DNA staining. It belongs to the family of monomethine cyanine dyes and is a tetracationic homodimer of Oxazole Yellow (abbreviated YO, hence the name YOYO), typically available as tetraiodide salt. In aqueous buffer, free YOYO-1 dye (absorption: λ_{max} 458 nm, emission: λ_{max} 564 nm) has very low fluorescence quantum yield. However, the intensity of fluorescence increases 3200 times upon binding through bis-intercalation to double-stranded DNA (absorption: λ_{max} 489 nm, emission: λ_{max} 509 nm).

== Synthesis ==
YOYO-1 is prepared by alkylation of N,N,N′,N′-tetramethyl-1,3-propanediamine with 2 equivalents of N-(3-iodopropyl) analogue of Oxazole Yellow, which is available in three steps from 2-mercaptobenzoxazole:

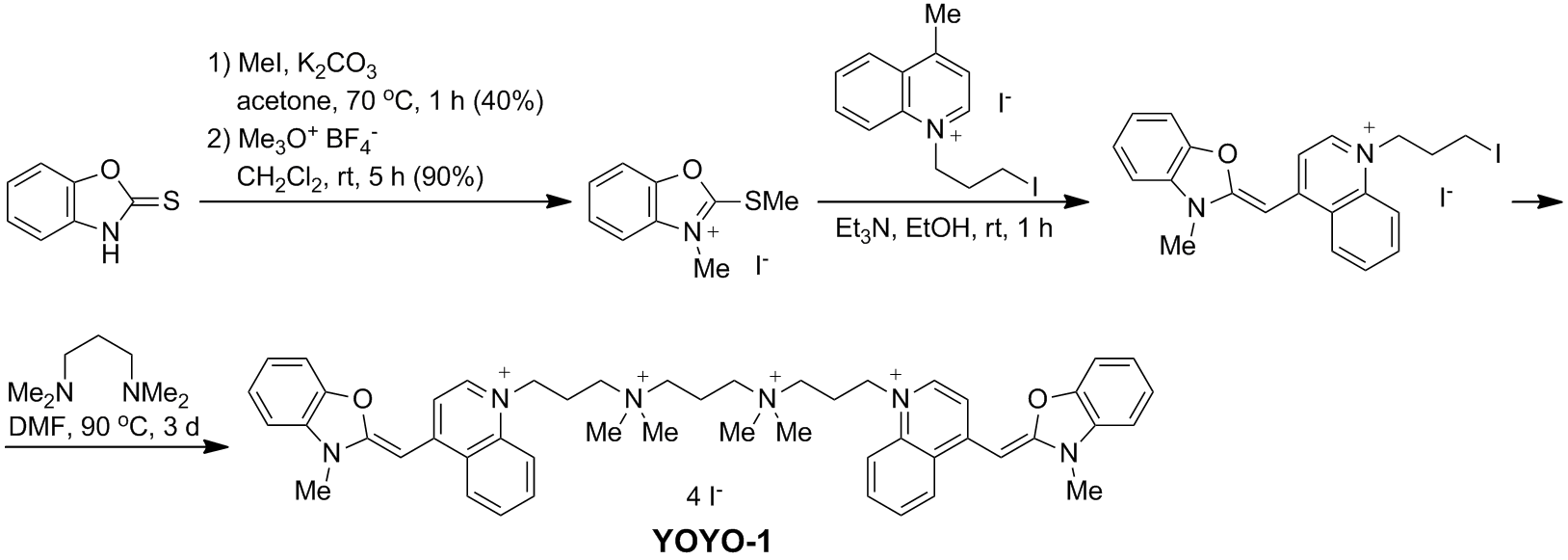
YOYO-1 synthesis

== Photophysics ==
The molar attenuation coefficient at the absorption peak of YOYO-1 is nearly 10^{5} cm^{−1}M^{−1}, among the high values of typical organic dyes. The fluorescence quantum yield of YOYO-1 in water is very small (<0.1%) and thus nonfluorescent. Upon binding to DNA, its quantum yield enhances >1000 fold and reaches up to 50%, among the brightest fluorescent organic dyes.

Under light excitation, photoblinking and photobleaching are observed for YOYO-1 in DNA. The latter is also believed to be the cause of the photocleavage of the host DNA molecules by generating reactive free radicals.

Two major mechanisms have been proposed in the literature to explain why YOYO-1 is not fluorescent in the polar solvents but is fluorescent when intercalated in the DNA base pairs. The first one is intramolecular charge transfer and the second is intermolecular charge transfer. Both are still actively under examination on which one being dominating.

The intramolecular charge transfer mechanism was established around the 1980s. Under light illumination in water, the excited electron in the molecule shifts its probability across the methine group which enables the molecule to rotate along with the methine group, a photoisomerization reaction. This rotation relaxes the energy nonradiatively thus the molecule is not fluorescent. However, when YOYO-1 is intercalated into the DNA base pairs, it gets stuck and cannot rotate. Thus the molecule stays fluorescent. The major evidence is when increase the viscosity of the solution by cooling down and increase the glucose content in a mixed solution, the quantum yield of YOYO-1 increases.

The intermolecular charge transfer mechanism was proposed in 2018. YOYO-1 is weakly bonded with the polar solvent molecules. When it is excited by light, an electron-hole pair is created in the molecule. The hole is able to get an extra electron from the solvent that created a negatively charged YOYO-1 radical and a positively charged radical in the solution. Most time the radical neutralize each other very quickly and nonradiatively. This is a Dexter electron transfer process that quenches the fluorescence and creates the rotation of the YOYO-1 molecule. As such, the rotation is a product of the quenching, not the cause of the quenching proposed in the intramolecular charge transfer mechanism. There is a small probability that the radicals separate each other and diffuse away, which then makes the YOYO-1 molecule susceptible to photobleaching. When the YOYO-1 molecules are intercalated in the DNA molecule, the hydrophobic base pairs greatly reduce the radical formation because DNA is a poor electrical conductor. Thus the fluorescent quenching by the solvent is greatly reduced. The small number of leaking charges create long-lived radicals and cut the DNA backbones that results in a DNA photocleavage. This mechanism has been supported by the data in femtosecond ultrafast transient absorption spectroscopy.

If the intramolecular charge transfer mechanism dominates the fluorescent quenching of YOYO-1 in water, then one can add bulky ligand to stop or slow down the rotation to increase its quantum yield in water. However, if the intermolecular charge transfer dominates, one can modify the molecule to stop the charge transfer between YOYO-1 and water either by charge passivation, or ligand modification to shift its redox potentials.

== Applications ==
The major applications of YOYO-1 are for DNA staining. Under normal conditions and pH level, the four positive charge of each YOYO-1 molecule makes it very easy to bind to DNA molecules which have negatively charged backbones. The dye then readily intercalates into the DNA either with one end or two ends depending on the annealing temperature and room available. The DNA then lights up under a fluorescence microscope with very small background from the unbound YOYO-1. The measurement can be at bulk ensemble level or at the single-molecule level. The latter has enabled ultra-high resolution using a super-resolution microscopy. With high illumination power, the dye is known to generate free radicals which then photocleave DNA strands.
