= Interchim =

French company

Interchim S.A.
- Type: private (Société Anonyme)
- Industry: Biotechnology
- Founded: 1970
- Headquarters: Montluçon, (France); San Diego, United States; UK
- Key people: Jamey Jones (CEO)
- Products: fine chemistry, chromatography and bio-analysis
- Number of employees: ~150 (2010)
- Subsidiaries: Interchim Inc., Cheshire
- Website: http://www.interchim.com

Interchim is a privately owned French company specialized in manufacturing and distribution of reagents, consumables and dedicated instruments for the R&D and industry laboratory in the fields of fine chemistry, chromatography and bio-analysis. It has become a provider of reference methods, products for analytics (analytical chemistry and bioassays) serving research and quality control in the biomedical field, pharmaceutical industry, but also cosmetics and environment.

== History ==
Interchim was founded by Boch Jean (formerly chemical engineer at Rhone-Poulenc) and Boch Colette in 1970. Their initial activity started with distribution of fine chemicals, then chromatography and Biology. Production was developed as well, in each fields. Affiliate companies were created for production and commercial activities in France, UK (2003), USA (2007) and Instrumentation business (2010). Interchim has now major activity in fine chromatography, fine chemistry and bio-analysis. Leadership in analytical sciences is based on distribution from leading groups (Agilent, Perkin Elmer, Jackson Immunoresearch, Novus, Radleys...), collaborations and proprietary innovative products.

== Activities ==
- The activity in Chromatography spans HPLC, LC/MS, FPLC, MPLC - GC, GC/MS, GPC, GFC - RMN - AA, IR, ICP, UV – SPE. Interchim notably introduced new generation silica chromatography media (UptiSphere that has become a standard worldwide, Strategy, Atoll).
- The activity in Fine Chemistry deals with compounds libraries (Chirals, Fluorines, Building blocks for Combi-Chemistry) and flash chromatography. Interchim developed a unique flash chromatography system (PuriFlashEvo430 - integrated functions).
- The activity in BioSciences focuses on Immunodetection, Biochemistry, Electrophoresis and Cell Assays. Interchim manufactures protein assays (BC Assay, Coo Assay), superior fluorescent dyes known as FluoProbes, Cell Assays reagents and kits (i.e. FluoProbes indicators, high sensitive viability assay UptiBlue) and an innovate transfection agent UptiFectin.
