= FluoProbes =

Fluorescent dye	Color	mass (g/mol)	Absorb (nm)	Emit (nm)	ε (M^{−1}cm^{−1})
FluoProbes 390	violet	343	390	479	24 000
FluoProbes 488	green	804	493	519	85 000
FluoProbes 532	yellow	765	532	553	117 000
FluoProbes547H	orange	736	557	574	150 000
FluoProbes 594	red	1137	601	627	120 000
FluoProbes647H	far-red	761	653	674	250 000
FluoProbes 682	far-red	853	690	709	140 000
FluoProbes 752	near-IR	879	748	772	270 000
FluoProbes 782	near-IR	976	783	800	170 000
Abs = absorption maximum^{#}, Em = emission maximum^{#} .................................. ε = molar extinction coefficient

The FluoProbes series of fluorescent dyes were developed by Interchim to improve performances of standard fluorophores. They are designed for labeling biomolecules, cells, tissues or beads in advanced fluorescent detection techniques.

- FluoProbes dyes are typically used to label proteins or nucleic acids (ultrafast -3 minutes- labeling of antibodies employs Lightning technology). Labeled products can be used for multiparameter detections, life time resolved fluorescence (TRF), polarisation anisotropy fluorescence, FRET, Quenching, FRAP. They are typically used in biotechnology and research applications as fluorescence microscopy, cell biology or molecular biology, as well as infrared imaging. Derivatives with Amine and Carboxyl suit peptide and nucleic acid synthesis, while reactive ones (with succinimidyl, maleimide and hydrazide) suit conjugation by conventional chemistry, while FluoProbes labeled antibodies and cellular probes (i.e. Phalloidin) suit direct use in immunoassays or cell assays.
- FluoProbes dyes that have comparable excitation and emission spectra to standard fluorophores such as fluoresceins, rhodamines, cyanines Cy2/3/5/5.5/7, are claimed to solve limiting issues observed in some applications such as too high background, insufficient polarity, photobleaching, insufficient brightness, or pH-sensitivity. I.e., FluoProbes488 reduces the background in Flow Cytometry and in slide microscopy allowing sharper and brighter images. FluoProbes 488, 547H and 647H are found more photostable that is taken to good account in applications using long illuminations periods (i.e. scanning such as in confocal microscopy), or for longer shelf-life of reagents (i.e. manufacturing diagnostics).

FluoProbes dye	Color	Light sources (spectral line)
FluoProbes 390	violet	Diode laser
FluoProbes 488; Fluorescein(FITC)/Cy2	cyan	Argon laser (488.0nm), Krypton laser (482.5nm)
FluoProbes 532	yellow	Helium–neon laser (632.8nm)
FluoProbes 547H; TRITC/Cy3	orange	Argon laser (528.7nm)
FluoProbes 594; SR101/TR	red	Argon laser (528.7nm)
FluoProbes 647H; Cy5	far red	Krypton laser (647.1nm), Laser (633nm)

- The excitation and emission spectra of the FluoProbes series covers much of the visible spectrum up to the infrared region, matching the commonly used light sources and filters.

Similar lines of fluorescent dyes provide an alternative to the FluoProbes Dyes.
