= Pacific Blue (dye) =

Names
- Preferred IUPAC name 6,8-Difluoro-7-hydroxy-2-oxo-2H-1-benzopyran-3-carboxylic acid

Identifiers
CAS Number	215868-31-8
3D model (JSmol)	Interactive image
ChEBI	CHEBI:63236
ChEMBL	ChEMBL104101
ChemSpider	13906206
PubChem CID	18942321
CompTox Dashboard (EPA)	DTXSID901337443
- InChI: Key: DLBFLQKQABVKGT-UHFFFAOYSA-L; InChI=1S/C10H4F2O5/c11-5-2-3-1-4(9(14)15)10(16)17-8(3)6(12)7(5)13/h1-2,13H,(H,14,15) Key: VYNDHICBIRRPFP-UHFFFAOYSA-N
- SMILES: OC(=O)c1cc2cc(F)c(O)c(F)c2oc1=O

Properties
Chemical formula	C_{10}H_{4}F_{2}O_{5}
Molar mass	242.134 g·mol^{−1}
- Except where otherwise noted, data are given for materials in their standard state (at 25 °C [77 °F], 100 kPa). verify (what is ?) Infobox references

Pacific Blue, or systematically 3-carboxy-6,8-difluoro-7-hydroxycoumarin, is a fluorophore used in cell biology. Its excitation maximum lies at 401 nm, while its emission maximum is at 452 nm. In contrast to the less acidic 7-hydroxy-3-carboxycoumarin (pKa=7.0), the high acidity of the phenol of Pacific Blue (pKa=3.7) causes its fluorescence to remain very high at neutral pH.

Pacific Blue is a member of the group of Pacific dyes, which includes Pacific Orange, Pacific Green, and Pacific Blue. These fluorescent dyes all have an absorption maximum between 400 and 410 nm, but with different emission spectra: this allows simultaneous excitation with one laser, producing emission at maxima of 551 nm, 500 nm and 455 nm, respectively (note: absorption and emission maxima may vary depending on the manufacturer).

In flow cytometry Pacific Blue (as well as other Pacific dyes) absorbs near 405 nm, disallowing simultaneous use with other fluorophores which share similar excitation and/or emission spectra, such as Brilliant Violet 421 (BV421) or V450.

== Usage ==
For purposes of immunohistochemistry or targeted staining in general, reactive forms of Pacific Blue are used to label targeting antibodies. Derivatives of Pacific Blue have been used to study small molecule-protein interactions using fluorescence resonance energy transfer (FRET). Pacific Blue has also been used to study interactions of the anticancer drug paclitaxel (Taxol) with tubulin in living cells. Reactive forms in use include Pacific Blue succinimidyl ester and Pacific Blue C5-Maleimide.
