= N-Iodosuccinimide =

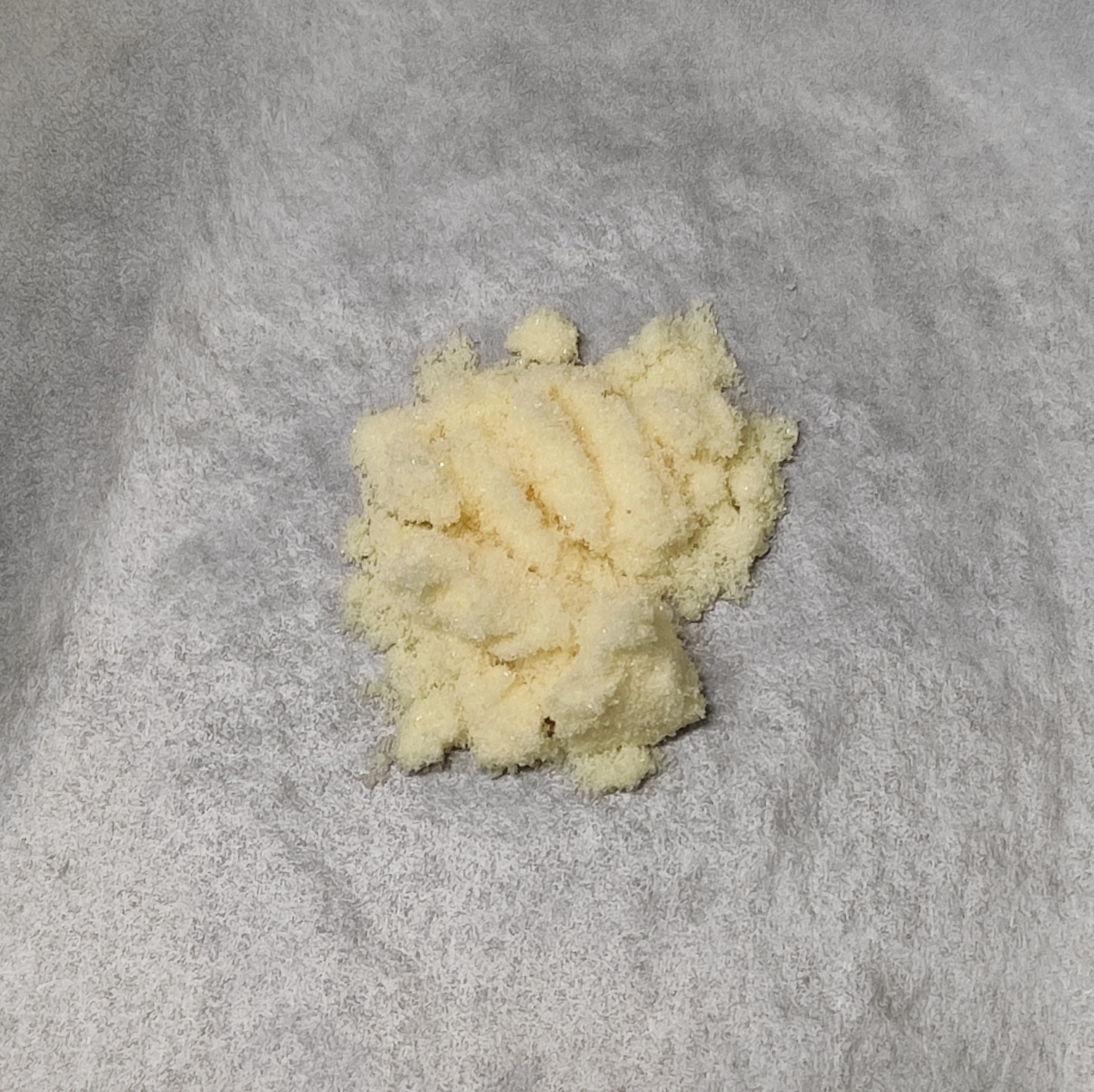

Names
- Preferred IUPAC name 1-Iodopyrrolidine-2,5-dione

Identifiers
CAS Number	516-12-1
3D model (JSmol)	Interactive image
Beilstein Reference	113917
ChEBI	CHEBI:53204
ChemSpider	107372
ECHA InfoCard	100.007.475
EC Number	208-221-6
Gmelin Reference	122896
PubChem CID	120273
UNII	3COS3X3N4P
CompTox Dashboard (EPA)	DTXSID10199550
- InChI: InChI=1S/C4H4INO2/c5-6-3(7)1-2-4(6)8/h1-2H2 Key: LQZMLBORDGWNPD-UHFFFAOYSA-N
- SMILES: C1CC(=O)N(C1=O)I

Properties
Chemical formula	C_{4}H_{4}INO_{2}
Molar mass	224.985 g·mol^{−1}
Appearance	White solid
Density	2.245 g/cm^{3}
Melting point	202–206 °C (396–403 °F; 475–479 K)(dec.)
Solubility	dioxane, THF, MeCN; insoluble in ether, CCl_{4}

Hazards
- GHS labelling
Pictograms	(GHS07: Exclamation mark)
Signal word	Warning
Hazard statements	H302, H315, H319, H335
Precautionary statements	P261, P264, P270, P271, P280, P301+P312, P302+P352, P304+P340, P305+P351+P338, P312, P321, P330, P332+P313, P337+P313, P362, P403+P233, P405, P501
- Except where otherwise noted, data are given for materials in their standard state (at 25 °C [77 °F], 100 kPa). Infobox references

N-Iodosuccinimide (NIS) is a reagent used in organic chemistry for the iodination of alkenes and as a mild oxidant.

NIS is the iodine analog of N-chlorosuccinimide (NCS) and N-bromosuccinimide (NBS) which are used for similar applications.
