= Hydroxycoumarin =

Hydroxycoumarin may refer to:

- 4-Hydroxycoumarin
- 7-Hydroxycoumarin (umbelliferone)
