= 3-Hydroxyisonicotinaldehyde =

Names
- Preferred IUPAC name 3-Hydroxypyridine-4-carbaldehyde
- Other names 3-Hydroxy-4-pyridinecarboxaldehyde

Identifiers
CAS Number	1849-54-3
3D model (JSmol)	Interactive image
ChemSpider	167264
ECHA InfoCard	100.238.477
EC Number	810-332-5
PubChem CID	192747
CompTox Dashboard (EPA)	DTXSID50171673
- InChI: InChI=1S/C6H5NO2/c8-4-5-1-2-7-3-6(5)9/h1-4,9H Key: NVLPDIRQWJSXLZ-UHFFFAOYSA-N
- SMILES: c1cncc(c1C=O)O

Properties
Chemical formula	C_{6}H_{5}NO_{2}
Molar mass	123.111 g·mol^{−1}
Density	1.327 g/cm^{3}
Melting point	126–128 °C (259–262 °F; 399–401 K)

Hazards
- GHS labelling
Pictograms	(GHS07: Exclamation mark)
Signal word	Warning
Hazard statements	H302, H315, H319, H335
- Except where otherwise noted, data are given for materials in their standard state (at 25 °C [77 °F], 100 kPa). Infobox references

3-Hydroxyisonicotinaldehyde (HINA), also known as 3-hydroxypyridine-4-carboxaldehyde, is a derivative of pyridine, with hydroxyl and aldehyde substituents. It has been studied as a simple analogue of vitamin B_{6}. In 2020, it was reported as having the lowest molecular weight of all dyes which exhibit green fluorescence.

== Preparation ==
3-Hydroxyisonicotinaldehyde was first prepared in 1958 by oxidation of 3-hydroxy-4-pyridinemethanol with manganese dioxide. Alternative syntheses have also been reported.

== Spectroscopic properties ==
The absorption spectrum of HINA has been the subject of studies dating back to the 1950s, owing to its relationship to vitamin B_{6} and pyridoxal, of which it is a simple analogue. However, its fluorescent properties were not described until 2020. It is noteworthy for having a green-emitting fluorophore with a wavelength of maximum emission (λ_{em,max}) at 525 nm in aqueous solution at alkaline pH, making it the compound of lowest molecular weight to display that property. In acidic solutions, the fluorescence is less intense and becomes blue; the compound has isosbestic points at 270 and 341 nm.

The molecular basis of the observed properties is the presence of a push-pull fluorophore, a feature of many fluorescent and luminescent compounds. At pH above 7.1 in aqueous solutions, HINA is in its anionic form, with its absorbance peak at 385 nm and emission peak at 525 nm. The anion contains just 13 atoms, with a molecular mass of 122 Da. The quantum yield for the emission is 15%, with an emission lifetime of 1.0 ns. The observed Stokes shift of 6900 cm^{−1} is typical of push-pull dyes.

== Uses ==
=== In mechanistic studies of vitamin B_{6} ===
HINA has been used as an analogue of pyridoxal 5′-phosphate, the active form of the coenzyme vitamin B_{6}. It is an especially good mimic for the enzyme-bound form of that compound, better than the vitamin or pyridoxal. The enzyme mechanism involves imine formation, giving a Schiff's base, and such derivatives of HINA with amino acids have been studied for their reaction kinetics, leading to insights about the enzymes which use pyridoxal 5-phosphate.

=== As a dyestuff ===
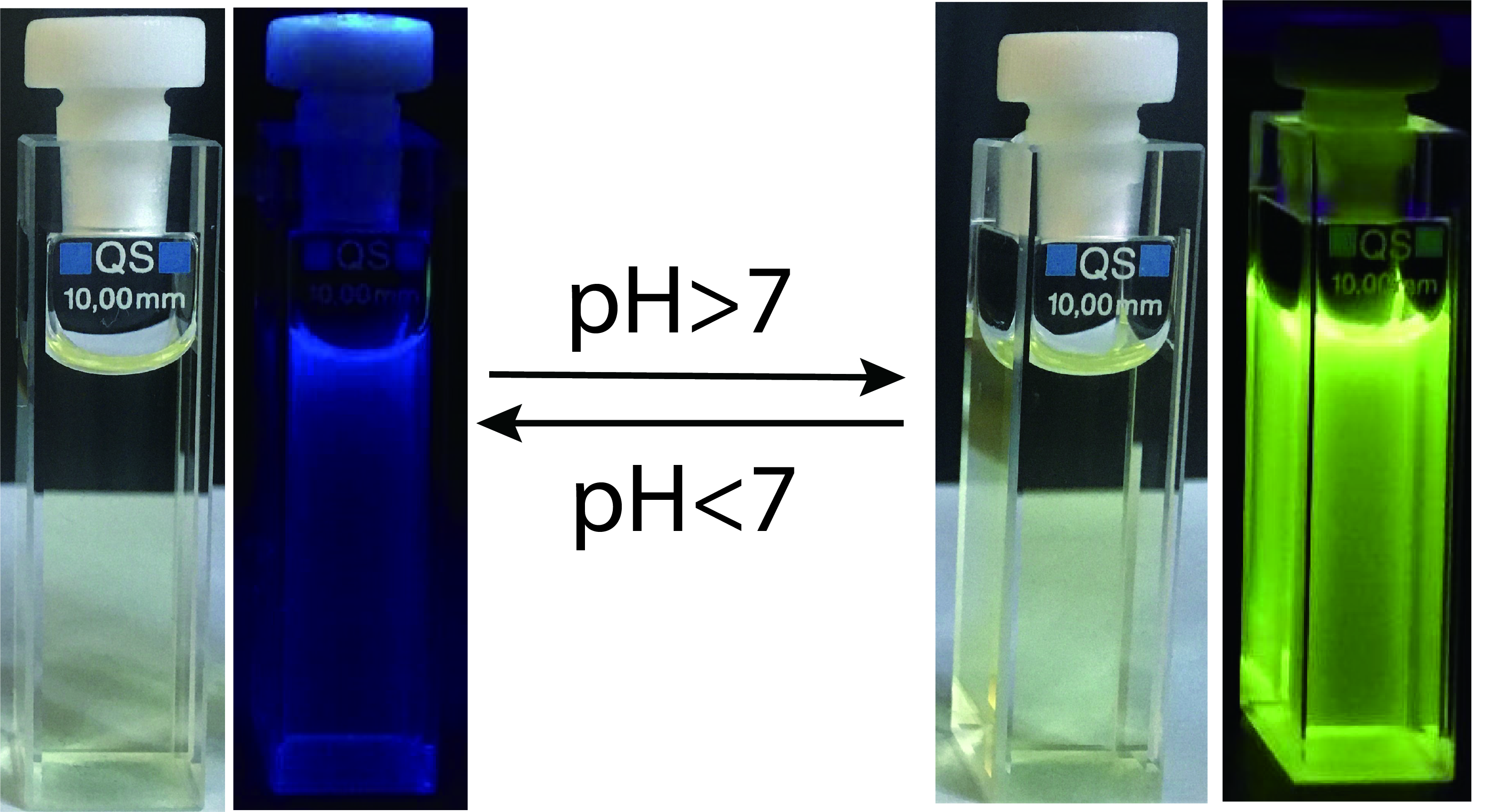
HINA fluorescence above and below pH 7

Stable dyes of low molecular weight which are water soluble are useful in biological systems. HINA has been used to detect and quantify the presence of cysteine in aqueous solutions.
