= Azadipyrromethene =

Class of chemical compounds

ADPM06, an azadipyrromethene

Azadipyrromethenes (ADPM) is a class of dyes used experimentally as photosensitizers for photodynamic therapy.

Some derivatives can usefully absorb in the near-infrared. It has also been demonstrated that supramolecular coordination of an anion can switch-off the photosensitising ability of azadipyrromethene derivatives, which could improve the selectivity of photodynamic therapy agents.

== See also ==
- Pyrromethene
