= SYTOX =

High-affinity nucleic acid stain

SYTOX (also known as SYTOX Green) is a high-affinity nucleic acid stain developed by Molecular Probes. Because the stain only penetrates cells with compromised plasma membranes, it can be used to investigate antibacterial mechanism of action and confirm loss of bacterial viability. It can be used for live cell imaging of bacteria.

SYBR Safe, SYBR Green, PicoGreen, SYTO-16, SYTO-9 and TOPhBu all can be used to detect DNA at low concentrations was evaluated using two new metrics, absolute fluorescence enhancement (AFE) and relativefluorescence enhancement (RFE).
