= N-Chlorosuccinimide =

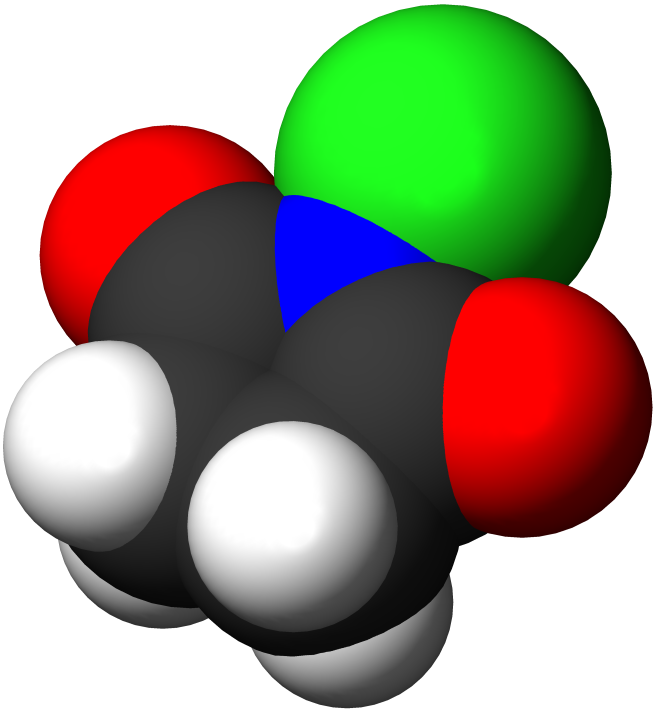

Names
- Preferred IUPAC name 1-Chloropyrrolidine-2,5-dione
- Other names Chlorosuccinimide

Identifiers
| CAS Number | 128-09-6 |
| 3D model (JSmol) | Interactive image |
| Abbreviations | NCS |
| Beilstein Reference | 113915 |
| ChEBI | CHEBI:53203 |
| ChEMBL | ChEMBL2107513 |
| ChemSpider | 29129 |
| ECHA InfoCard | 100.004.436 |
| EC Number | 204-878-8 |
| Gmelin Reference | 122816 |
| PubChem CID | 31398 |
| UNII | 0FWP306H7X |
| CompTox Dashboard (EPA) | DTXSID2042199 |
- InChI: InChI=1S/C4H4ClNO2/c5-6-3(7)1-2-4(6)8/h1-2H2 Key: JRNVZBWKYDBUCA-UHFFFAOYSA-N; InChI=1/C4H4ClNO2/c5-6-3(7)1-2-4(6)8/h1-2H2 Key: JRNVZBWKYDBUCA-UHFFFAOYAN
- SMILES: O=C1N(Cl)C(=O)CC1

Properties
| Chemical formula | C_{4}H_{4}ClNO_{2} |
| Molar mass | 133.53 g·mol^{−1} |
| Appearance | white solid |
| Density | 1.65 g/cm^{3} |
| Melting point | 148 to 150 °C (298 to 302 °F; 421 to 423 K) |

Hazards
- GHS labelling
| Pictograms | (GHS05: Corrosive) (GHS07: Exclamation mark) |
| Signal word | Danger |
| Hazard statements | H302, H314, H319, H335, H412 |
| Precautionary statements | P260, P264, P270, P271, P273, P280, P301+P312, P301+P330+P331, P303+P361+P353, P304+P340, P305+P351+P338, P310, P312, P321, P330, P337+P313, P363, P403+P233, P405, P501 |

Related compounds
| Related Imides | Succinimide; N-Bromosuccinimide; N-Iodosuccinimide |
- Except where otherwise noted, data are given for materials in their standard state (at 25 °C [77 °F], 100 kPa). verify (what is ?) Infobox references

N-Chlorosuccinimide (NCS) is the organic compound with the formula C_{2}H_{4}(CO)_{2}NCl. This white solid is used for chlorinations. It is also used as a mild oxidant. NCS is related to succinimide, but with N–Cl in place of N–H. The N–Cl bond is highly reactive, and NCS functions as a source of "Cl^{+}".

== Synthesis and selected reactions ==
NCS is produced from succinimide by treatment with Cl^{+} sources, such as sodium hypochlorite (bleach), and t-butylhypochlorite, and even chlorine.

Electron-rich arenes are readily monochlorinated by NCS. Aniline and mesitylene are converted to the respective chlorinated derivatives.

== Related reagents ==
- N-Iodosuccinimide (NIS), the iodine analog of N-chlorosuccinimide.
- N-bromosuccinimide (NBS), the bromine analog of N-chlorosuccinimide.
- Other N-chloro compounds that are commercially available include chloramine-T, trichloroisocyanuric acid ((OCNCl)_{3}), and 1,3-dichloro-5,5-dimethylhydantoin.
