= Chromomycin A3 =

Names
- IUPAC name (6S,7S)-6-[(4-O-Acetyl-2,6-dideoxy-3-C-methyl-α-L-arabino-hexopyranosyl)-(1→3)-(2,6-dideoxy-β-D-arabino-hexopyranosyl)-(1→3)-2,6-dideoxy-β-D-arabino-hexopyranosyloxy]-7-[(1S)-5-deoxy-1-O-methyl-D-threo-pent-2-ulos-1-C-yl]-4,10-dihydroxy-3-methyl-5-oxo-5,6,7,8-tetrahydroanthracen-2-yl (2,6-dideoxy-4-O-methyl-D-lyxo-hexopyranosyl)-(1→3)-2,6-dideoxy-D-lyxo-hexopyranoside 4-acetate
- Systematic IUPAC name (1^{2}S,1^{4}S,1^{5}S,1^{6}S,3^{2}S,3^{4}R,3^{5}R,3^{6}R,5^{2}S,5^{4}R,5^{5}R,5^{6}R,7^{2}S,7^{3}S,9^{2}S,9^{4}R,9^{5}S,9^{6}R,11^{2}R,11^{4}R,11^{5}R,11^{6}R)-7^{3}-[(1S,3S,4R)-3,4-Dihydroxy-1-methoxy-2-oxopentyl]-1^{4},3^{5},5^{5},7^{8},7^{9},11^{4}-heptahydroxy-11^{5}-methoxy-1^{4},1^{6},3^{6},5^{6},7^{7},9^{6},11^{6}-heptamethyl-7^{1}-oxo-7^{1},7^{2},7^{3},7^{4}-tetrahydro-2,4,6,8,10-pentaoxa-1,11(2),3,5(4,2),9(2,4)-pentakis(oxana)-7(2,6)-anthracenaundecaphane-1^{5},9^{5}-diyl diacetate
- Other names Toyomycin

Identifiers
CAS Number	7059-24-7
ChEMBL	ChEMBL216639
ChemSpider	16735739
ECHA InfoCard	100.027.589
PubChem CID	656673
UNII	DVW027E7NL
CompTox Dashboard (EPA)	DTXSID4046363
- InChI: InChI=1S/C56H80O27/c1-20-32(78-38-18-35(51(25(6)75-38)83-55(67)68)81-36-15-31(59)50(70-10)24(5)74-36)14-29-12-28-13-30(52(71-11)49(66)44(61)21(2)57)53(48(65)42(28)47(64)41(29)43(20)60)82-39-17-33(45(62)23(4)73-39)79-37-16-34(46(63)22(3)72-37)80-40-19-56(9,69)54(26(7)76-40)77-27(8)58/h12,14,21-26,30-31,33-40,44-46,50-54,57,59-64,69H,13,15-19H2,1-11H3,(H,67,68)/t21-,22-,23-,24-,25-,26+,30+,31-,33-,34-,35-,36-,37+,38+,39+,40+,44+,45-,46-,50+,51+,52+,53+,54+,56+/m1/s1 Key: VWUDFIOZFAFOMW-QUOOOCNJSA-N; InChI=1S/C56H80O27/c1-20-32(78-38-18-35(51(25(6)75-38)83-55(67)68)81-36-15-31(59)50(70-10)24(5)74-36)14-29-12-28-13-30(52(71-11)49(66)44(61)21(2)57)53(48(65)42(28)47(64)41(29)43(20)60)82-39-17-33(45(62)23(4)73-39)79-37-16-34(46(63)22(3)72-37)80-40-19-56(9,69)54(26(7)76-40)77-27(8)58/h12,14,21-26,30-31,33-40,44-46,50-54,57,59-64,69H,13,15-19H2,1-11H3,(H,67,68)/t21-,22-,23-,24-,25-,26+,30+,31-,33-,34-,35-,36-,37+,38+,39+,40+,44+,45-,46-,50+,51+,52+,53+,54+,56+/m1/s1 Key: VWUDFIOZFAFOMW-QUOOOCNJBW; Key: VWUDFIOZFAFOMW-QUOOOCNJSA-N

Properties
Chemical formula	C_{57}H_{82}O_{26}
Molar mass	1183.257 g·mol^{−1}
- Except where otherwise noted, data are given for materials in their standard state (at 25 °C [77 °F], 100 kPa). verify (what is ?) Infobox references

Chromomycin A3 (CMA_{3}) or Toyomycin is an anthraquinone antibiotic glycoside produced by the fermentation of a certain strain of Streptomyces griseus (No. 7).

== Fluorescence properties ==
In the presence of Mg^{2+} ions, Chromomycin A_{3} binds reversibly to DNA, preferentially to contiguous G/C base pairs.

When bound to DNA, Chromomycin A_{3} has a maximum excitation wavelength of 445 nm (blue), and a maximum emission wavelength of 575 nm (yellow).

== Uses ==
- in-vitro membrane-impermeant G/C-specific fluorescent DNA-binding dye.
- in-vitro antibiotic of gram-positive bacteria, through inhibition of the incorporation of P_{i} in the RNA.
- in-vitro anticancer drug that inhibits RNA synthesis.
- Evaluation of male fertility: Chromomycin A_{3} and protamines compete for the same binding sites in the DNA, so CMA_{3} positivity in spermatozoa reflects protamine deficiency (affecting sperm morphology and decreasing fertility).
