= N-Bromosuccinimide =

Molecule

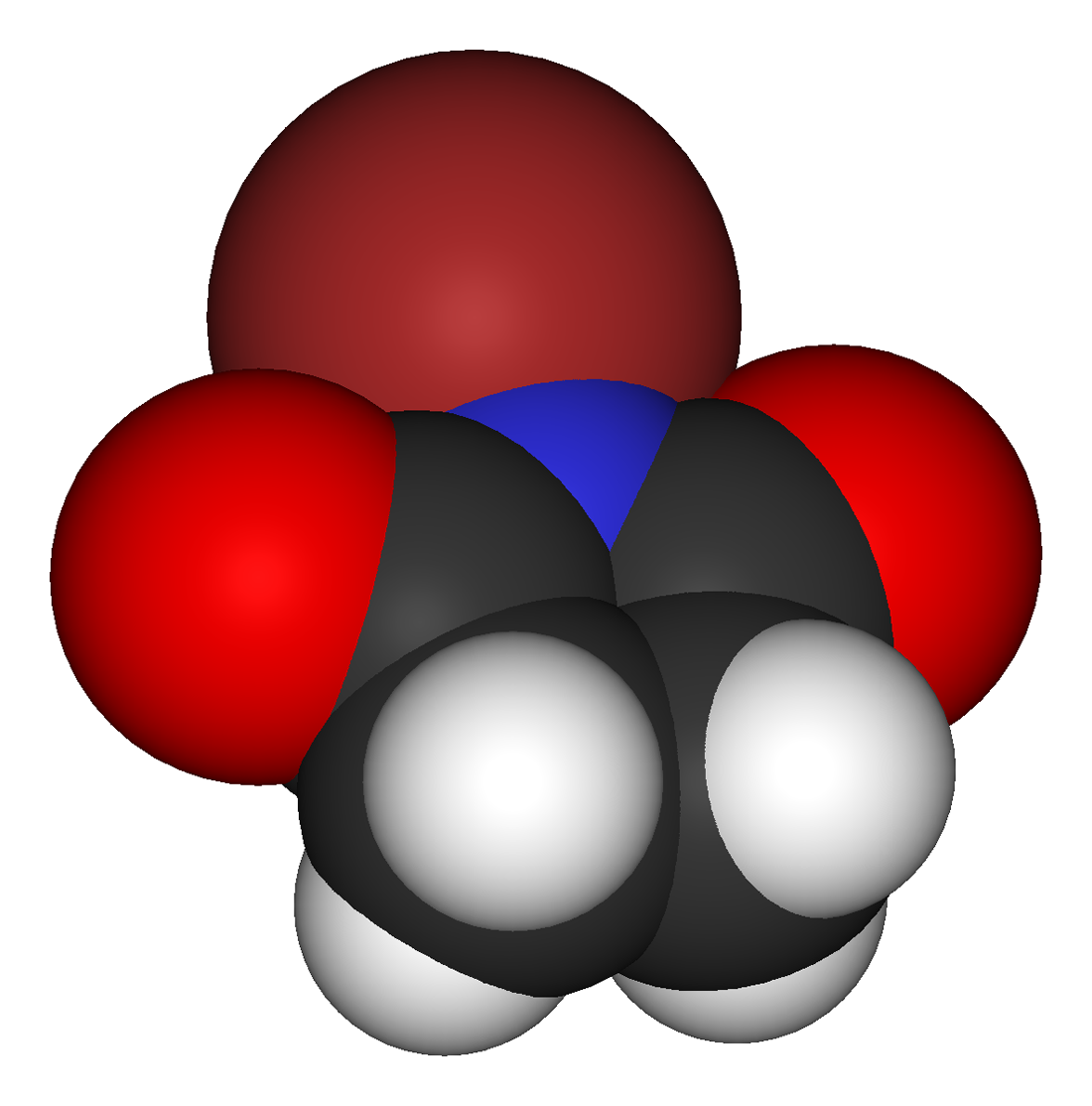

Names
- Preferred IUPAC name 1-Bromopyrrolidine-2,5-dione
- Other names N-bromosuccinimide; NBS

Identifiers
CAS Number	128-08-5
3D model (JSmol)	Interactive image
Beilstein Reference	113916
ChEBI	CHEBI:53174
ChemSpider	60528
ECHA InfoCard	100.004.435
EC Number	204-877-2
Gmelin Reference	26634
PubChem CID	67184
UNII	K8G1F2UCJF
CompTox Dashboard (EPA)	DTXSID2038738
- InChI: InChI=1S/C4H4BrNO2/c5-6-3(7)1-2-4(6)8/h1-2H2 Key: PCLIMKBDDGJMGD-UHFFFAOYSA-N; InChI=1/C4H4BrNO2/c5-6-3(7)1-2-4(6)8/h1-2H2 Key: PCLIMKBDDGJMGD-UHFFFAOYAS
- SMILES: BrN1C(=O)CCC1=O

Properties
Chemical formula	C_{4}H_{4}BrNO_{2}
Molar mass	177.985 g·mol^{−1}
Appearance	White solid
Density	2.098 g/cm^{3} (solid)
Melting point	175 to 178 °C (347 to 352 °F; 448 to 451 K)
Boiling point	339 °C (642 °F; 612 K)
Solubility in water	14.7 g/L (25 °C)
Solubility in CCl_{4}	Insoluble (25 °C)

Hazards
- Occupational safety and health (OHS/OSH)
Main hazards	Irritant
- Safety data sheet (SDS)
- Except where otherwise noted, data are given for materials in their standard state (at 25 °C [77 °F], 100 kPa). verify (what is ?) Infobox references

N-Bromosuccinimide or NBS is a chemical reagent used in radical substitution, electrophilic addition, and electrophilic substitution reactions in organic chemistry. NBS can be a convenient source of Br^{•}, the bromine radical.

== Preparation ==
NBS is commercially available. It can also be synthesized in the laboratory. To do so, sodium hydroxide and bromine are added to an ice-water solution of succinimide. The NBS product precipitates and can be collected by filtration.

Crude NBS gives better yield in the Wohl–Ziegler reaction. In other cases, impure NBS (slightly yellow in color) may give unreliable results. It can be purified by recrystallization from preheated (90 to 95 °C) water (10 g of NBS for 100 mL of water).

== Reactions ==
=== Addition to alkenes ===
NBS reacts with alkenes in aqueous solvents to give bromohydrins. The preferred conditions are the portionwise addition of NBS to a solution of the alkene in 50% aqueous DMSO, DME, THF, or tert-butanol at 0 °C. Formation of a bromonium ion and immediate attack by water gives strong Markovnikov addition and anti stereochemical selectivities.

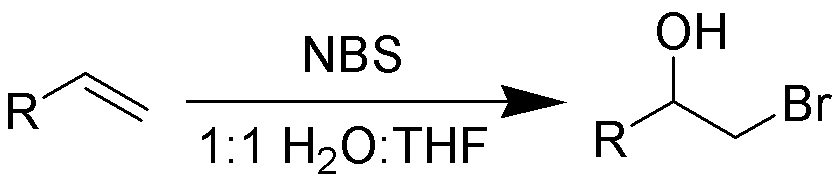

Side reactions include the formation of α-bromoketones and dibromo compounds. These can be minimized by the use of freshly recrystallized NBS.

With the addition of nucleophiles, instead of water, various bifunctional alkanes can be synthesized.

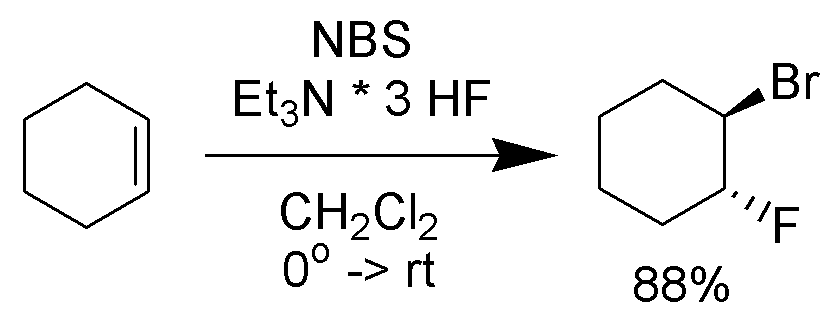

=== Allylic and benzylic bromination ===
Standard conditions for using NBS in allylic and/or benzylic bromination involves refluxing a solution of NBS in anhydrous CCl_{4} with a radical initiator—usually azobisisobutyronitrile (AIBN) or benzoyl peroxide, irradiation, or both to effect radical initiation. The allylic and benzylic radical intermediates formed during this reaction are more stable than other carbon radicals and the major products are allylic and benzylic bromides. This is also called the Wohl–Ziegler reaction.

The carbon tetrachloride must be maintained anhydrous throughout the reaction, as the presence of water may likely hydrolyze the desired product. Barium carbonate is often added to maintain anhydrous and acid-free conditions.

In the above reaction, while a mixture of isomeric allylic bromide products are possible, only one is created due to the greater stability of the 4-position radical over the methyl-centered radical.

=== Bromination of carbonyl derivatives ===
NBS can α-brominate carbonyl derivatives via either a radical pathway (as above) or via acid-catalysis. For example, hexanoyl chloride 1 can be brominated in the alpha-position by NBS using acid catalysis.

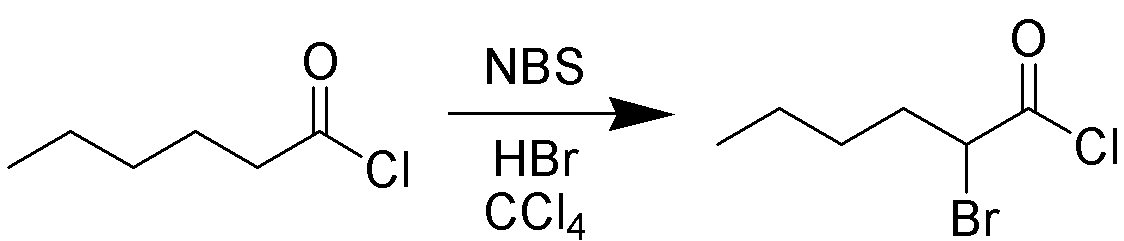

The reaction of enolates, enol ethers, or enol acetates with NBS is the preferred method of α-bromination as it is high-yielding with few side-products.

=== Bromination of aromatic derivatives ===
Electron-rich aromatic compounds, such as phenols, anilines, and various aromatic heterocycles, can be brominated using NBS. Using DMF as the solvent gives high levels of para-selectivity.

=== Hofmann rearrangement ===
NBS, in the presence of a strong base, such as DBU, reacts with primary amides to produce a carbamate via the Hofmann rearrangement.

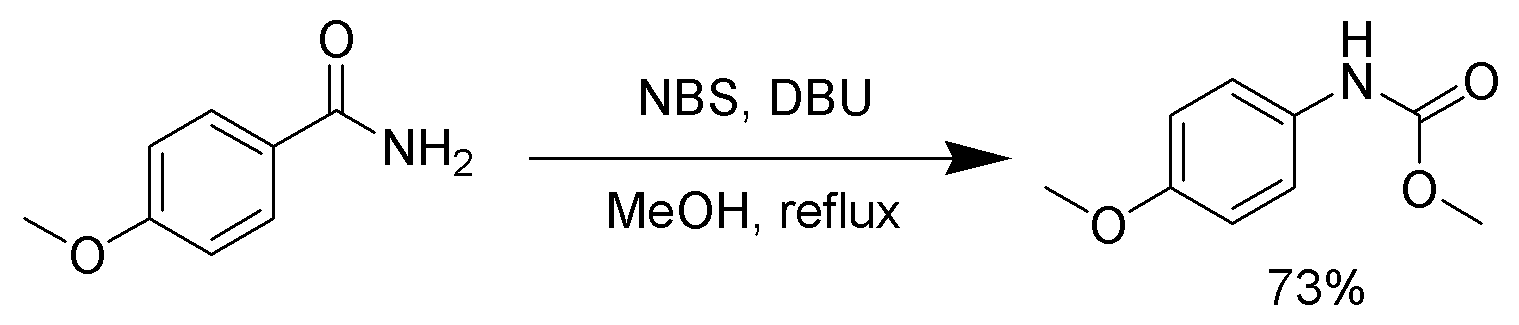

=== Selective oxidation of alcohols ===
It is uncommon, but possible for NBS to oxidize alcohols. E. J. Corey et al. found that one can selectively oxidize secondary alcohols in the presence of primary alcohols using NBS in aqueous dimethoxyethane (DME).

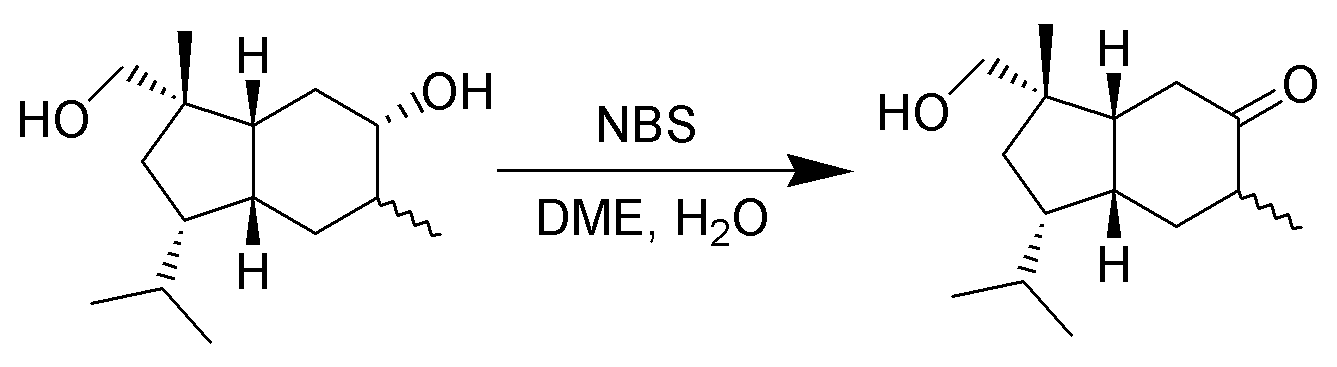

=== Oxidative decarboxylation of α-amino acids ===
NBS electrophilically brominates the amine, which is followed by decarboxylation and release of an imine. Further hydrolysis will yield an aldehyde and ammonia. (cf. non-oxidative PLP dependent decarboxylation)

== Precautions ==
NBS is a weaker equivalent to bromine in its dangers. NBS is typically stored in a refrigerator. Pure NBS is white, but it is often found to be off-white or brown colored by bromine.

Some reactions involving NBS are exothermic, requiring suitable precautions.

== See also ==
- Halohydrin formation
- N-Chlorosuccinimide
- N-Iodosuccinimide
