= Biosearch Technologies =

American biotechnology company

Biosearch Technologies, Inc.
- Type: Private
- Industry: Biotechnology
- Founded: 1993; 33 years ago
- Founder: Ronald Cook
- Headquarters: Petaluma, United States
- Number of locations: 11
- Key people: Tim Robinson; CEO
- Number of employees: 778 (2023)
- Parent: LGC Ltd
- Website: Biosearchtech.com

Biosearch Technologies, Inc. (doing business as LGC Biosearch Technologies, Inc.) is a biotechnology company located in California. It specializes in diagnostics, nucleic acid production, PCR systems, and other molecular biology lab kits and services.

Acquired in 2015 by LGC Ltd, Biosearch Technologies operates within the Genomics division of LGC. Biosearch Technologies has a network of nine manufacturing facilities and three service labs in the US and Europe, and serves customers across a number of markets including pharmaceuticals, agricultural biotechnology, diagnostics, food safety, environment, government and academia.

== History ==
Biosearch Technologies was founded in 1993, inheriting expertise from founder Dr. Ronald Cook's previous venture, Biosearch Inc, which produced DNA synthesis instruments.

In 2013, Biosearch Technologies acquired the oligonucleotide manufacturing arm of DNA Technology and the entirety of VitraBio, a maker of porous glass.

In 2015, Biosearch Technologies was acquired by LGC. In 2016, Douglas Scientific was also acquired by LGC, and merged operations with Biosearch Technologies.

=== Recognition in PCR research ===
When Kary Mullis received the Nobel Prize in 1993 and gave his Nobel Lecture concerning his invention of the polymerase chain reaction (PCR) method, he acknowledged Biosearch Inc and Dr. Cook's role in providing him one of the first SAM I DNA synthesizers which was used to support Kary Mullis' PCR research.

== Products ==
Biosearch Technologies licenses products meant for lab work and biotechnology manufacturing, including dyes and primers, as well as Stellaris FISH probes. In the past, they have developed detection panels for both H1N1 and Avian Influenza A. In addition, they offer a web-based software called RealTimeDesign to help scientists craft custom oligonucleotides.
