= 2,3-Dichloro-5,6-dicyano-1,4-benzoquinone =

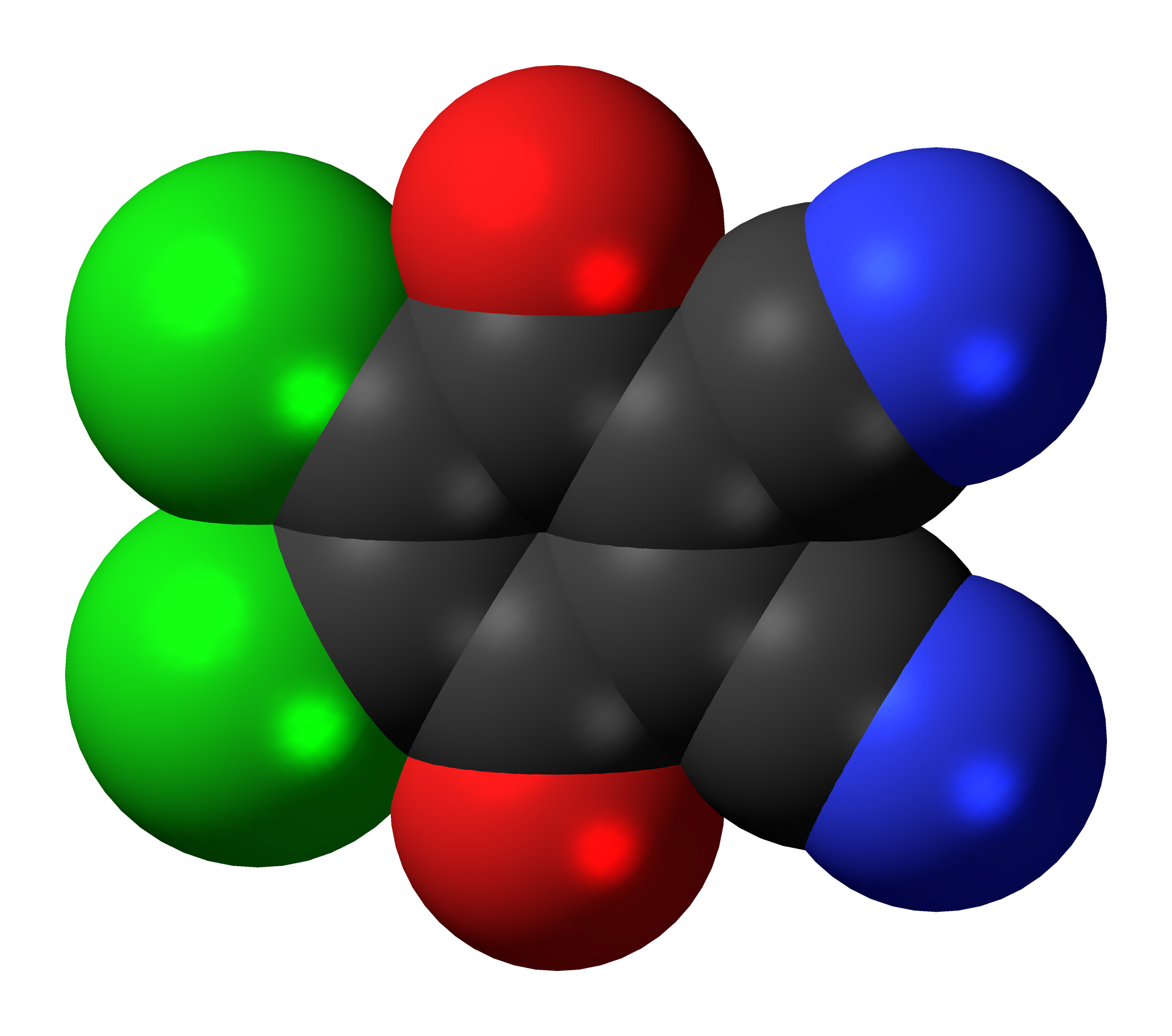

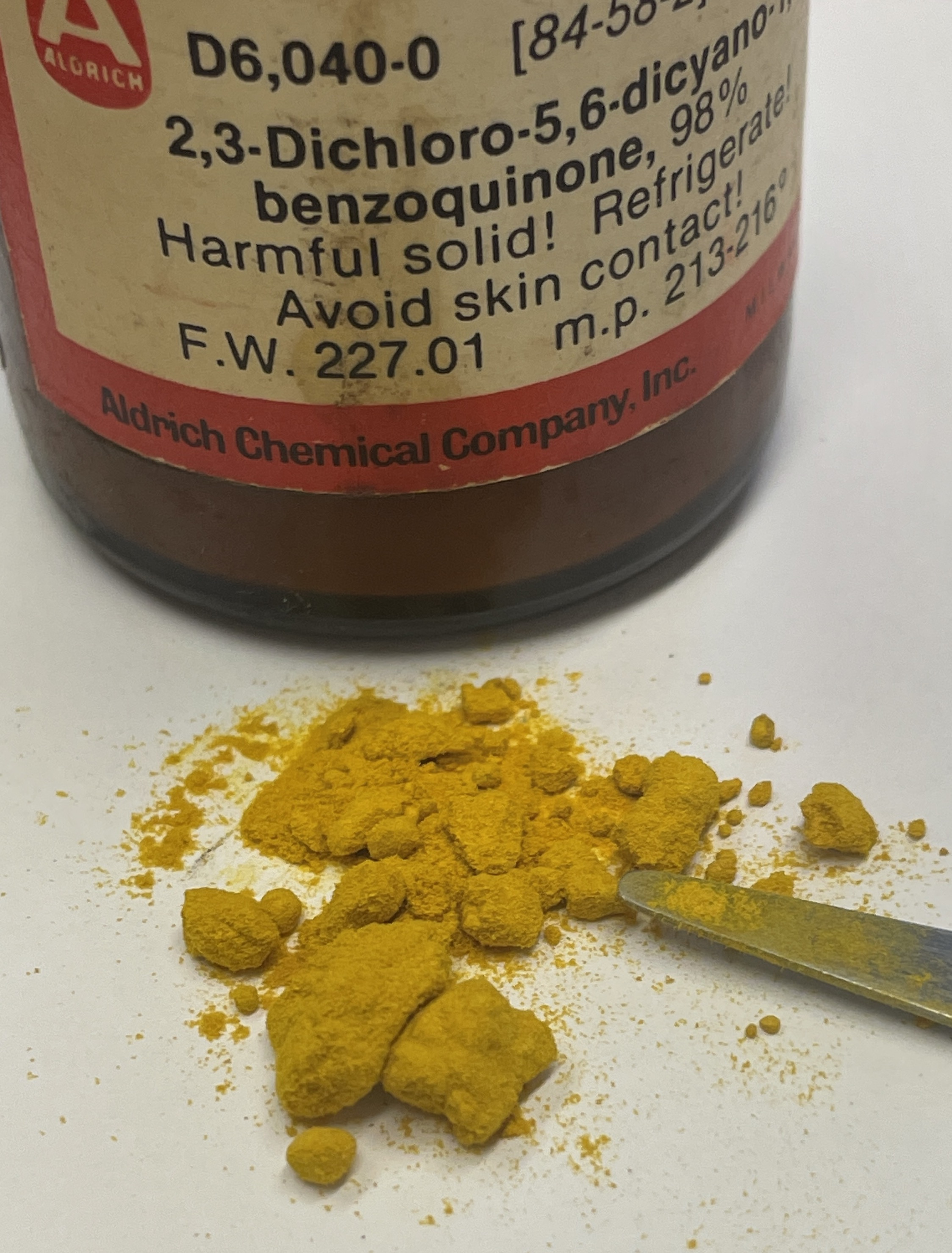

Names
- Preferred IUPAC name 4,5-Dichloro-3,6-dioxocyclohexa-1,4-diene-1,2-dicarbonitrile
- Other names: 2,3-Dichloro-5,6-dicyano-p-benzoquinone; 4,5-Dichloro-3,6-dioxo-1,4-cyclohexadiene-1,2-dicarbonitrile; Dichlorodicyanobenzoquinone

Identifiers
CAS Number	84-58-2
3D model (JSmol)	Interactive image
Abbreviations	DDQ
ChemSpider	6517
ECHA InfoCard	100.001.402
EC Number	201-542-2
PubChem CID	6775
RTECS number	GU4825000
UNII	1H5KD39UH7
CompTox Dashboard (EPA)	DTXSID7052577
- InChI: InChI=1S/C8Cl2N2O2/c9-5-6(10)8(14)4(2-12)3(1-11)7(5)13 Key: HZNVUJQVZSTENZ-UHFFFAOYSA-N; InChI=1/C8Cl2N2O2/c9-5-6(10)8(14)4(2-12)3(1-11)7(5)13 Key: HZNVUJQVZSTENZ-UHFFFAOYAL
- SMILES: ClC=1C(=O)C(\C#N)=C(\C#N)C(=O)C=1Cl

Properties
Chemical formula	C_{8}Cl_{2}N_{2}O_{2}
Molar mass	227.00 g·mol^{−1}
Appearance	yellow to orange powder
Density	1.7g/cm3
Melting point	210–215 °C (410–419 °F; 483–488 K) (decomposes)
Boiling point	301.8 °C (575.2 °F; 575.0 K) at 760mmHg
Solubility in water	reacts

Hazards
- GHS labelling
Pictograms	(GHS06: Toxic)
Signal word	Danger
Hazard statements	H301
Precautionary statements	P264, P270, P301+P310, P321, P330, P405, P501
Flash point	136.3 °C (277.3 °F; 409.4 K)
- Except where otherwise noted, data are given for materials in their standard state (at 25 °C [77 °F], 100 kPa). verify (what is ?) Infobox references

2,3-Dichloro-5,6-dicyano-1,4-benzoquinone (or DDQ) is the chemical reagent with formula C_{6}Cl_{2}(CN)_{2}O_{2}. This oxidant is useful for the dehydrogenation of alcohols, phenols, and steroid ketones. DDQ decomposes in water, but is stable in aqueous mineral acid.

== Preparation ==
Synthesis of DDQ involves cyanation of chloranil. J. Thiele and F. Günther first reported a 6-step preparation in 1906. The substance did not receive interest until its potential as a dehydrogenation agent was discovered. A single-step chlorination from 2,3-dicyanohydroquinone was reported in 1965.

== Reactions ==
The reagent removes pairs of H atoms from organic molecules. The stoichiometry of its action is illustrated by the conversion of tetralin to naphthalene:

2 C_{6}Cl_{2}(CN)_{2}O_{2} + C_{10}H_{12} → 2 C_{6}Cl_{2}(CN)_{2}(OH)_{2} + C_{10}H_{8}

The resulting hydroquinone is poorly soluble in typical reaction solvents (dioxane, benzene, alkanes), which facilitates workup.

Solutions of DDQ in benzene are red, due to the formation of a charge-transfer complex.

=== Aromatization ===
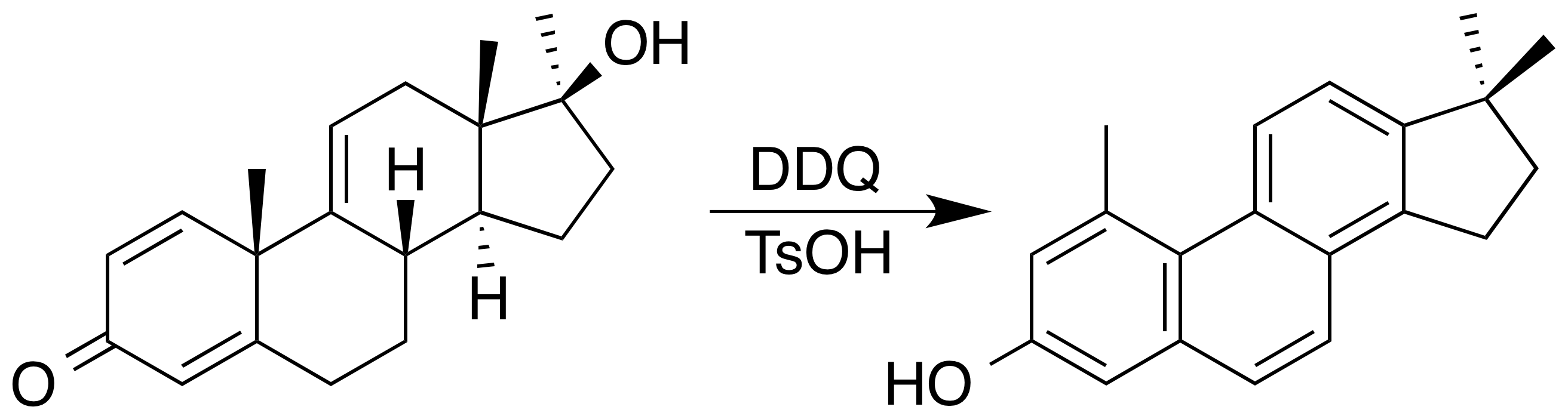

=== Cross-Dehydrogenative Coupling ===
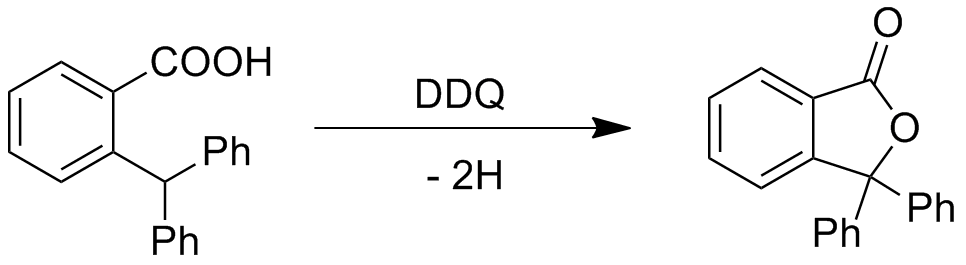

== Safety ==
DDQ reacts with water to release highly toxic hydrogen cyanide (HCN).
