= Strawberry anemone =

Strawberry anemone may refer to several taxa of sea anemones:

- Actinia fragacea, a species found in the north-eastern Atlantic Ocean and the Mediterranean
- Corynactis, a genus
- Corynactis annulata, a species found in the southern Atlantic Ocean
- Corynactis californica, a species found on the Pacific coast of North America
