= Corallimorphus niwa =

Scientific classification
- Domain: Eukaryota
- Kingdom: Animalia
- Phylum: Cnidaria
- Class: Hexacorallia
- Order: Corallimorpharia
- Family: Corallimorphidae
- Genus: Corallimorphus
- Species: C. niwa

Binomial name
- Corallimorphus niwa Fautin, 2011

Species of coral

Corallimorphus niwa is a species of corals in the genus Corallimorphus. It was classified by Fautin in 2011. Corallimorphus niwa lives in marine habitats.

New species of corallimorphus niwa was found in new Zealand. This new species like other members of also possess Corallimorphus stiff and hyaline mesoglea, short column relative to its broad oral disc, and deep-sea habitat.

== Etymology ==
The specie name “niwa” honors the New Zealand National Institute of Water and Atmospheric Research. It should be viewed as a random combination of letters. The name "Corallimorphus” is masculine in gender.

== Taxonomic context ==
Order Corallimorpharias

Anthozoa can be found in both surface and boundless seas. Deep-sea species are typically isolated, while shallow-water forms are often clonal, they reproduce asexually by fission or pedal laceration. The presence of Zooxanthellae is conditional. Due to the mesoglea's thickness their consistency ranges from rigid to soft, and they often produce copious mucus. Shallow water species usually have a flattened, adherent base, while deep-sea forms may have an unattached base. Their column is smooth, lacking vesicles or other structures, and may have weak longitudinal muscles. Tentacles are generally non retractile, simple or branched, with one tentacle per exocoel and multiple per endocoel, arranged radially and cyclically. The actinopharynx is short with deep folds, and siphonoglyphs are weak or absent. Mesenteries are irregularly arranged, with weak retractor muscles, and the gametogenic region is at the same level as the filaments. The cnidom includes spirocysts, holotrichs, and different types of mastigophores.

Family Corallimorphidae

Corallimorpharia are found in both shallow and deep seas. Deep-sea species are usually solitary, while shallow-water species tend to be clonal, reproducing asexually through longitudinal fission or pedal laceration. Zooxanthellae are absent in these organisms. Their body consistency ranges from soft and flexible to stiff and cartilaginous. The tentacles are simple: Marginal tentacles alternate between endocoelic and exocoelic, while discal tentacles, all connected to endocoels, are typically arranged radially and in cycles, with at least two tentacles connected to each older endocoel. Directive mesenteries are generally present, and the presence of marginal sphincter muscles can vary. Spirocysts, a type of cnidae, are commonly found in large numbers.

Genus Corallimorphus

Deep-sea corallimorphidae family. Polyps are isolated. The column is small in comparison to the oral disc, which has a diameter of up to 100 mm and is usually wider than the pedal disc. Mesoglea is typically found in the oral disc and is yellowish-hyaline, thick at least in the column. Animal unable to fully retract; column unable to cover oral disc and tentacles; stiff, cartilaginous in texture. lacking a marginal sphincter muscle. In many species only one discal tentacle interacts with each endocoel. The genus Corallimorphus has members from every latitude; the observed depth range for the genus is 30-4429 m. It has five recognized species except C.niwa.

Species of Corallimorphus

Species of Corallimorphus niwa for in New Zealand are: NIWA 14330, NIWA 5563, KUIZ 003021, KUIZ 003019, NIWA 34507, NIWA 13272, NIWA 41756, KUIZ 003020, NIWA 41750, NIWA 14329, NIWA 12718.

The oral disc is generally circular, varying from flat to strongly domed, with a diameter ranging from 30 to 125 mm in the specimens studied. It is typically wider than or about the same diameter as the pedal disc, which is also circular and can be flat or slightly concave. The column is very short, measuring 10 to 30 mm, and can be either straight or curved inward, making the mid-column narrower than both the oral and pedal discs. The margin often overhangs the pedal disc.

The colors of these organisms vary, with the oral disc ectoderm typically appearing brownish or rust red along the mesenterial insertions. Longitudinal red lines, likely following the mesenterial insertions, may be visible on the column. The pigment can sometimes be retained after preservation, and the ectoderm may appear yellowish or may be completely sloughed off.

The oral disc has a central, slit-like mouth, measuring about 18 mm long in the holotype. The distal end of the actinopharynx is exposed and displays a red coloration in individuals that retain their pigmentation.

Tentacles not contractile, short, most with acrosphere slightly greater in diameter than distal end of tentacle stalk.

== Habitat ==
Corallimorphus niwa are located at depths of 926–1773 m in seas around New Zealand.

Locality type: Northern edge of Chatham Rise (42.5390–42.5433ºS, 178.3382–178.3400ºE), at 1404–1414 m.

Geographic and bathymetric distribution: Corallimorphus niwa n. sp. can be tracked around the regions of New Zealand at depths of about 900 to 1700 m.
