= Corallimorphus profundus =

Scientific classification
- Domain: Eukaryota
- Kingdom: Animalia
- Phylum: Cnidaria
- Subphylum: Anthozoa
- Class: Hexacorallia
- Order: Corallimorpharia
- Family: Corallimorphidae
- Genus: Corallimorphus
- Species: C. profundus

Binomial name
- Corallimorphus profundus Moseley, 1877

Synonyms
- Corallimorphus antarcticus Carlgren & Stephenson, 1929

Species of coral

Corallimorphus profundus is a species of corals in the genus Corallimorphus. It lives in marine habitats. This species can be found in the Southern Ocean and in New Zealand.

Corallimorphus profundus is considered a deep water species that most closely resembles the scleractinians: stony corals. Based on their morphological properties and genome organization, they are heavily scleractinian like in comparison to all other corallimorpharians. This makes C. profundus an early diverging species that holds a key role in the coral to corallimorpharia transition.
