= Rhodactis howesii =

Scientific classification
- Kingdom: Animalia
- Phylum: Cnidaria
- Subphylum: Anthozoa
- Class: Hexacorallia
- Order: Corallimorpharia
- Family: Discosomidae
- Genus: Rhodactis
- Species: R. howesii

Binomial name
- Rhodactis howesii Saville-Kent, 1893

Synonyms
- Discosoma howesi; Discosoma howesii (Saville-Kent, 1893); Rhodactis howesi Saville-Kent, 1893

Species of sea anemone

Rhodactis howesii is a species of marine cnidarian in the order Corallimorpharia, a sea anemone-like corallimorph found on reefs in tropical regions of the Pacific Ocean. It is commonly known as the green fuzzy mushroom, elephant ear mushroom coral, giant anemone, giant mushroom anemone and giant cup mushroom. This species is toxic when eaten raw and ingestion can cause fatal poisoning.

== Description ==
This coral mushroom is essentially a coral without a skeleton and its internal structure is similar to a stony coral. The upper surface is the oral disc. It has a short stalk or column below which is the pedal disc which adheres to the substrate. It can detach itself and drift to another location. It is either green or brown, and five to eight centimetres high. The tentacles are very short and somewhat knobbly, giving the oral disc a fuzzy appearance. The tentacles at the edge of the disc are longer and contain toxins which damage other corals close by but which are harmless to humans. R. howesii is a carnivore and catches plankton and other micro particles that float past its oral disc. It also obtains nutriments from its endosymbiotic algae.

== Reproduction ==
There are three asexual means of reproduction. Budding can occur when new individuals are formed from pieces that divide off from the pedal disc. Fragmentation can occur when the individual moves slowly over the substrate and leaves small pieces of itself behind which eventually grow into new individuals. Division or fission can also occur when the corallimorph divides down the centre to form two new individuals.

Sexual reproduction also sometimes occurs and eggs and sperm are released into the water. They unite and form free-swimming larvae which are initially planktonic. Later they settle and adhere to the substrate, growing into new individuals.

== Toxicity ==
American Samoans call R. howesii "matamalu" and are aware that consuming it uncooked can be fatal. Such ingestion has been recorded and may have happened accidentally or may have been used as a means of committing suicide. Cooking seems to destroy the poison and cooked "matamalu" is commonly eaten by the Samoans.

The three patients who had been poisoned by R. howesii and who were observed in a hospital in Samoa, fell into a prolonged stupor which lasted from 8 to 36 hours. During this time the knee jerk reflex and the pupillary light reflex were absent but the blood pressure and pulse rate remained normal. All three developed prolonged shock and later died from pulmonary oedema. The medical history and the course of their illness resembled the paralytic poisoning caused by shellfish.

== Invasiveness ==
Under some circumstances, R. howesii may become an invasive species. In 1991, a hundred-foot vessel was shipwrecked on Palmyra Atoll National Wildlife Refuge. Thirteen years later it was observed that R. howesii had colonised the area around the wreck. Over the next few years, the population increased rapidly close to the vessel and by 2008 had reached high concentrations and a phase shift had occurred in the ecology of the reef. Around the ship, R. howesii covered the sea bed overgrowing and directly competing with the few remaining corals (mainly Montipora sp., Pocillopora sp. and Acropora sp.). Close to the wreck there were as many as 288 individuals per square metre and it extended for up to 1100 metres from the vessel. Quite why R. howesii has flourished so abundantly at this location is not fully understood, but it is possible that iron is leaching from the ship and promoting its growth. This hypothesis is supported by the fact that similar explosive growth in numbers of R. howesii has occurred around the mooring chains of three buoys anchored some distance from the wreck. Iron is an essential trace element for growth of algae and nitrogen fixation, and much of the Pacific Ocean is extremely low in available iron which is a limiting resource for many marine organisms. Iron may also stimulate the growth of the symbiotic zooxanthellae in the polyps.
