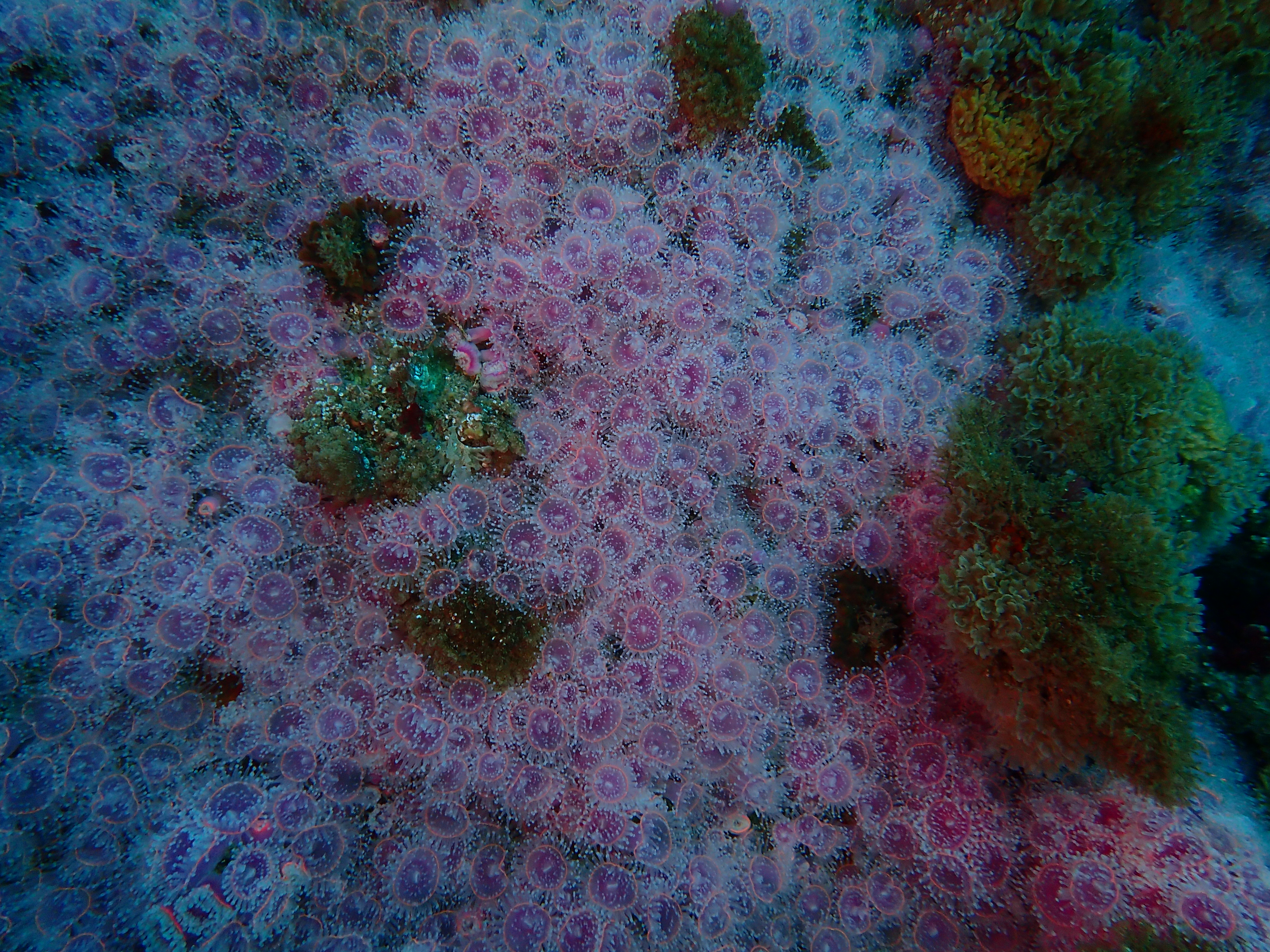

Scientific classification
- Domain: Eukaryota
- Kingdom: Animalia
- Phylum: Cnidaria
- Subphylum: Anthozoa
- Class: Hexacorallia
- Order: Corallimorpharia
- Family: Corallimorphidae
- Genus: Corynactis
- Species: C. annulata

Binomial name
- Corynactis annulata (Verrill, 1867)

Synonyms
- Melactis annulata Verrill, 1867; Ropalactis annulata (Verrill, 1867)

= Corynactis annulata =

Species of sea anemone

Corynactis annulata, or the strawberry anemone, is a bright pink colonial anthozoan similar in body form to sea anemones and scleractinian stony corals. This species is a solitary animal of the order Corallimorpharia.

== Description ==
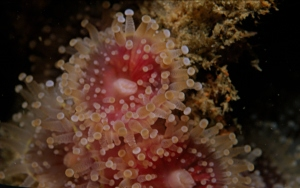
Corynactis annulata may also be reddish in colour

The strawberry anemone is a very distinctive small bright pink anemone having white knobs on the ends of its tentacle tips. It grows to a diameter of 1 centimetre (0.39 in). Green and reddish colour morphs are also known.

== Distribution ==
This species is found around the southern African coast from Port Nolloth to Mossel Bay, intertidally to 35 metres (115 ft). It is also known from the Inaccessible Archipelago in the southern Atlantic Ocean.

== Ecology ==
It occurs in clusters and sheets on rocky reefs and wrecks. It feeds on small planktonic organisms.
