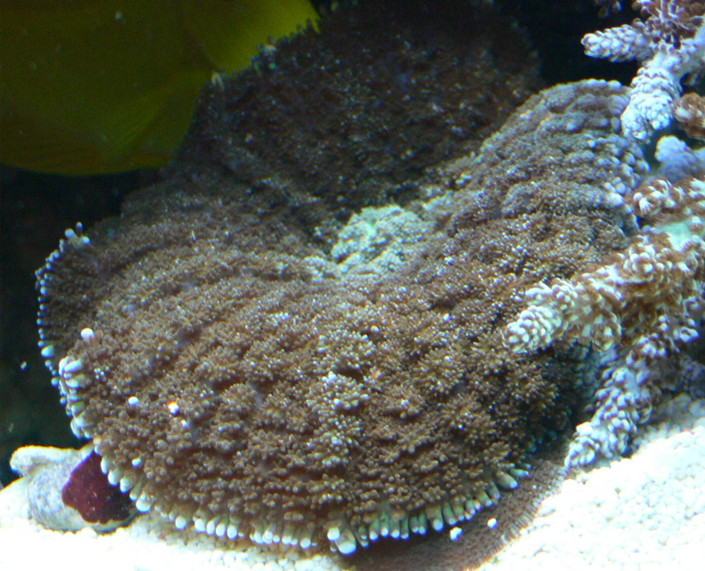
- In an aquarium

Scientific classification
- Kingdom: Animalia
- Phylum: Cnidaria
- Subphylum: Anthozoa
- Class: Hexacorallia
- Order: Corallimorpharia
- Family: Discosomidae
- Genus: Rhodactis
- Species: R. inchoata

Binomial name
- Rhodactis inchoata Carlgren, 1943

= Rhodactis inchoata =

Genus of corals

Rhodactis inchoata, otherwise known as the bullseye mushroom or Tonga blue mushroom, is a species of mushroom coral in the genus Rhodactis, this species is also, but more uncommonly, referred to as the hairy or small elephant ear mushroom. This species of Rhodactis cnidarian can also sometimes be kept in aquariums, and mostly prefers low to medium lighting in the room where it is kept in, and a low level in water movement, which makes this species easy to keep in an aquarium.

== Aquarium care ==
This species of coral mostly prefers low to medium light, and low lighting in general, in its environment, as well as low-water movement, which makes this species easy to maintain in an aquarium, which normally requires for the coral to be in the lower-regions of the aquarium tank, seeing as how it will be partially shaded off from all other light sources which might disturb it. The species itself is semi-aggressive, so, if you put it in an aquarium tank, you will have to be precise where you put it, as it might damage, or even kill, other species in the tank itself due to how it is semi-aggressive in behaviour, and proper spacing must be observed in the tank.

== Symbiotic relationships ==
Rhodactis inchoata has a symbiotic relationship with the species of algae called zooxanthellae, and this species of algae is contained within the tissues of R. inchoata. But when in captivity, you are required to feed this species nanoplankton, but you may add dissolved organics in the water itself if needed to.

== Distribution ==
Rhodactis inchoata can be found in the waters of the Indo-Pacific ocean.

== Description ==
Rhodactis inchoata possess a small surface which is covered with tentacles, those tentacles form small clusters which give this species a unique appearance when comparing it to other corals. The stalk of this species is relatively small, and is often not noticed when spotted in a reef. The area around the oral disk of this species is bare, which makes R. inochoata an easy species to identify when going scuba diving or when looking for it. R. inochoata can sometimes be found with purple bodies, and green margins, highlights of these margins include multicoloured green, red and blue, and while also possessing a red coloured mouth.

This species can actually warp to the surface of the oral disc, which changes the water flow around them and direct particulate and flocculent material which they then move to their mucus-covered centre in order to absorb the material. R. inochoata has been known to grow up to 1.5 - 3" (4 - 8 cm), however, the lifespan of this species has not been documented yet, leaving people puzzled about how long R. inochoata lives for.
