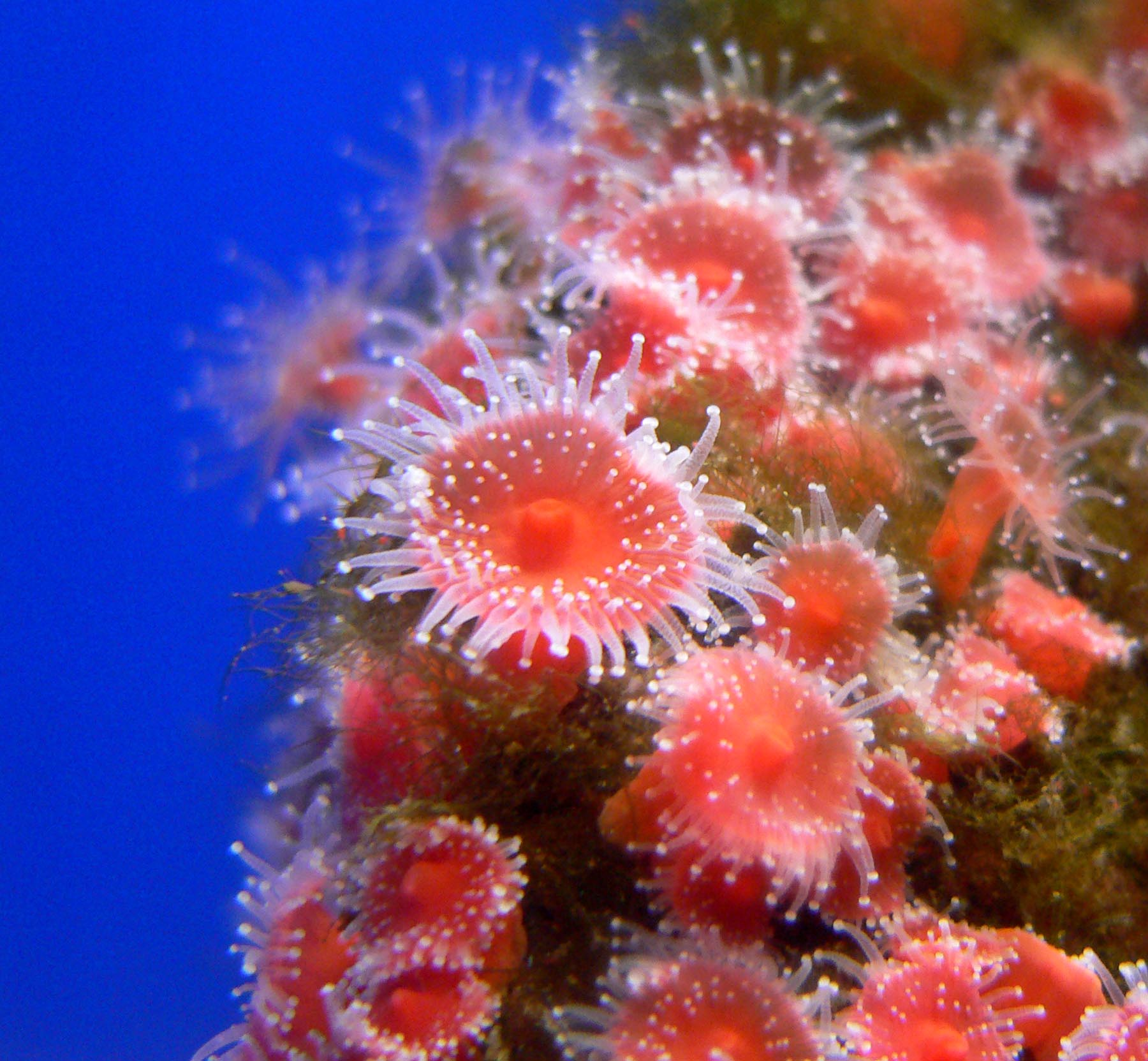
- Large colony off Santa Cruz Island, California

Scientific classification
- Kingdom: Animalia
- Phylum: Cnidaria
- Subphylum: Anthozoa
- Class: Hexacorallia
- Order: Corallimorpharia
- Family: Corallimorphidae
- Genus: Corynactis
- Species: C. californica

Binomial name
- Corynactis californica Carlgren, 1936

= Corynactis californica =

Species of sea anemone

Corynactis californica is a brightly colored colonial anthozoan corallimorph. Unlike the Atlantic true sea anemone, Actinia fragacea, that bears the same common name, strawberry anemone, this species is a member of the order Corallimorpharia, and is the only member found on the west coast of North America. Other common names include club-tipped anemone and strawberry corallimorpharian. The anemone can live up to at least 50 meters (164 ft) deep on vertical rock walls, and at the bottom of kelp forests. It is known to carpet the bottom of some areas, like Campbell River in British Columbia, and Monterey Bay in California.

== Description ==
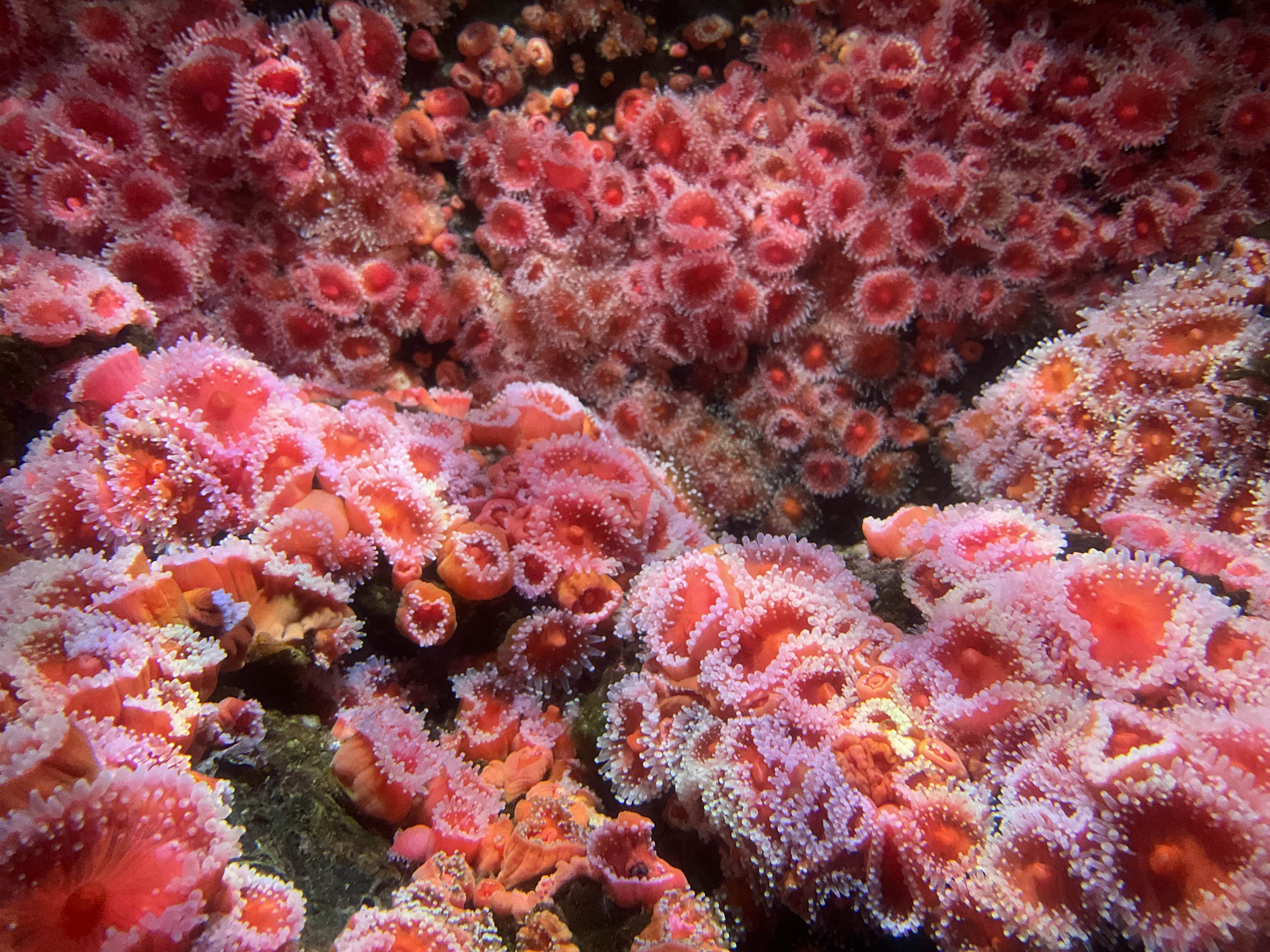
At the Vancouver Aquarium.

The strawberry anemone grows no larger than 2.5 centimeters (1 in). The anemone can be red, pink, purple, brown, yellow, or completely white. They possess tentacles that are white or transparent with bulbous tips. The strawberry anemone resembles sea anemones in that they lack a calcareous skeleton, but are closer related to stony corals in that they lack basilar muscles. This species lacks photosynthetic symbionts.

The strawberry anemone is known to reproduce both sexually and asexually, with asexual reproduction used to cover more available ground. The anemone is known to attack other species of sea anemone and coral that they are competitive with, as to take over the areas left behind by the previous occupants. They attack with toxins passed through prolonged contact. The same method is used in self-defense and in food consumption.

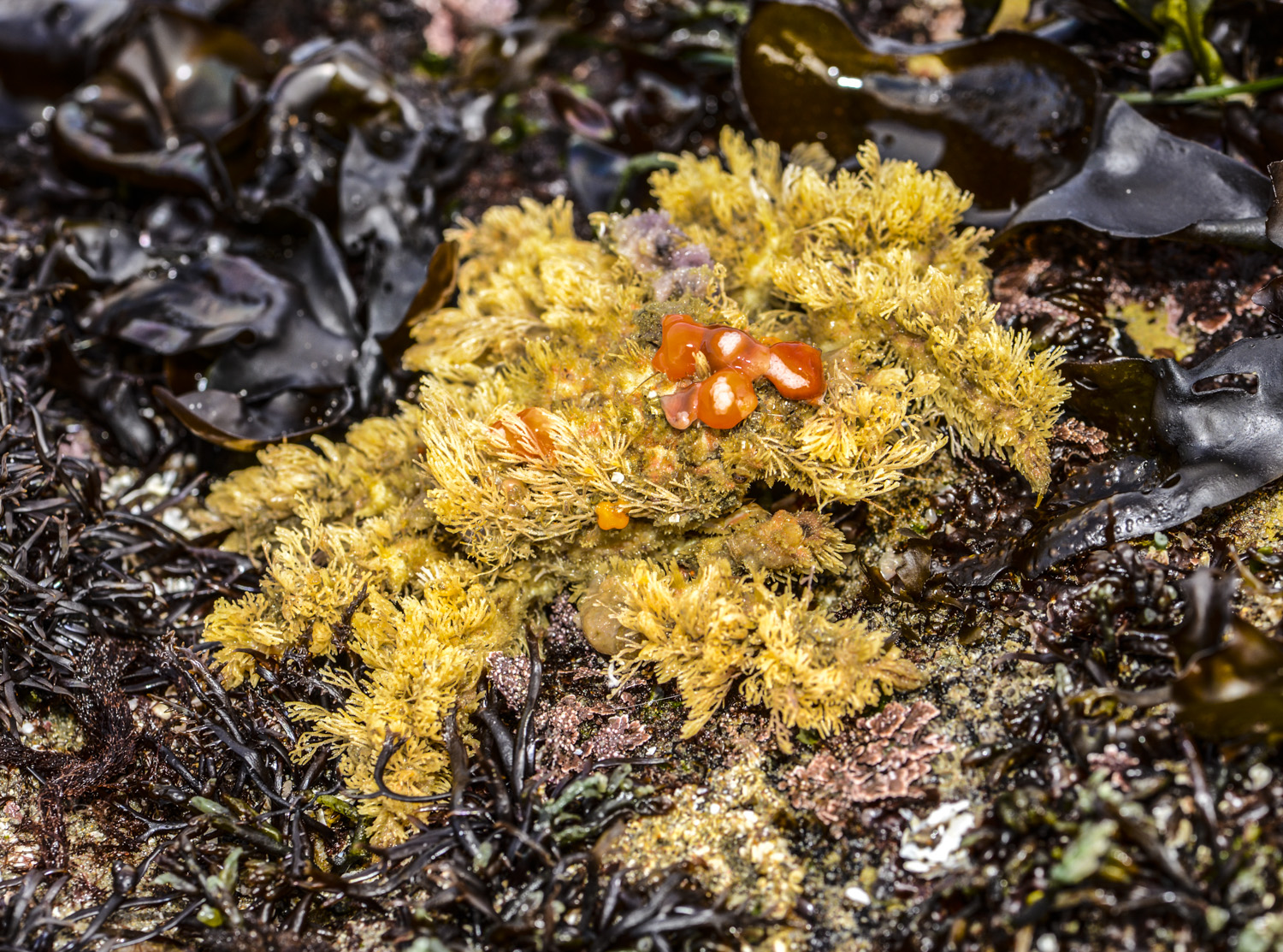
Small red strawberry anemones growing on the back of a masking crab

== Reproduction ==
The strawberry anemone can reproduce both sexually and asexually through fission and budding. It is dioecious, and produces both egg strings and testicular cysts in sync through all polyps in a clone. The gametes are stored in the mesoglea, in the gastrovascular cavity. They are typically produced in an annual cycle between August and November, and are spawned from late November to mid-December. Gametes are released into the surrounding water, where they form embryos that turn into planktonic larvae within 2–3 days.

== Behavior ==
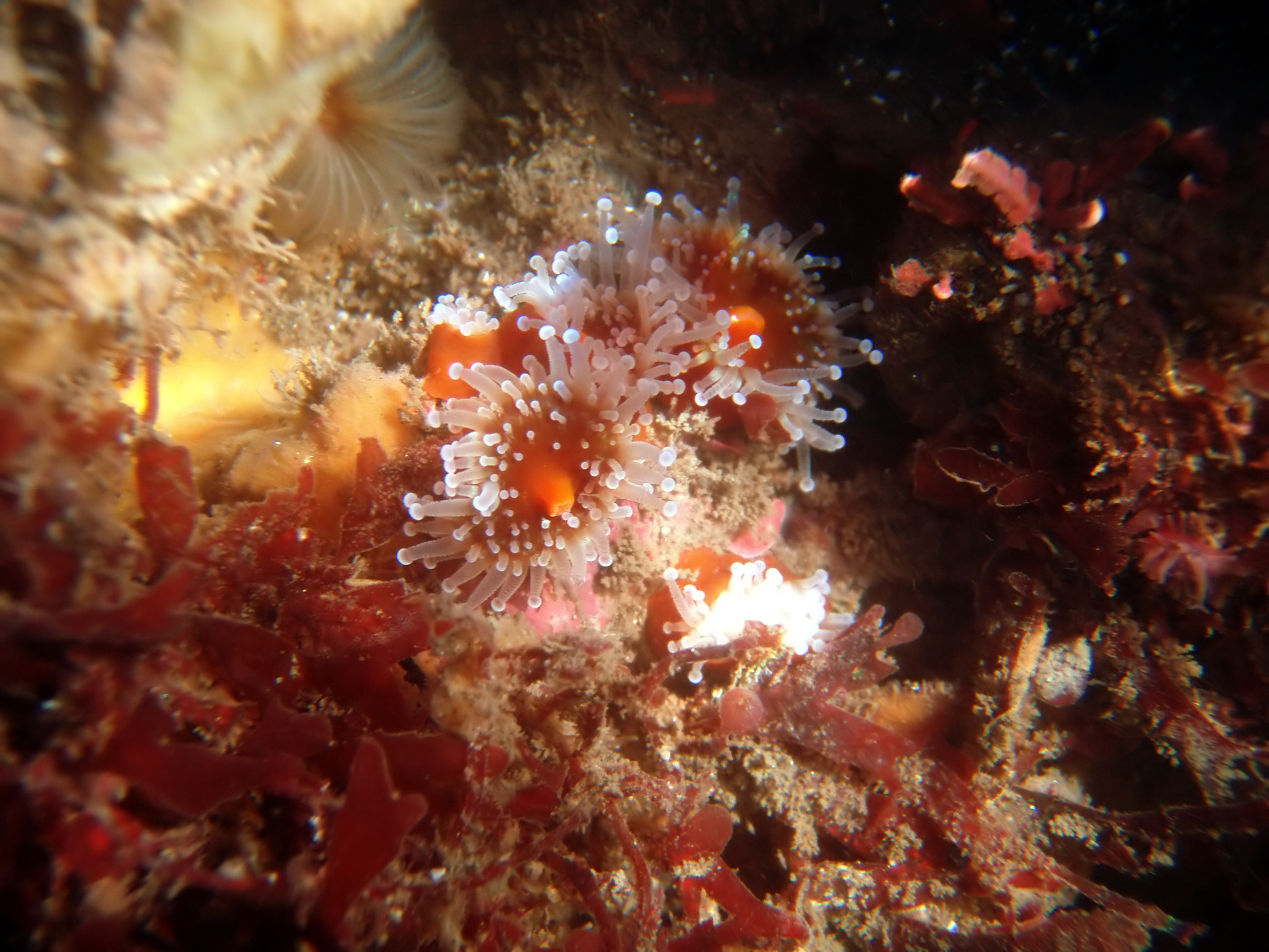
Strawberry anemones in a tide pool

The strawberry anemone has been shown to attack competing species of sea anemone and coral when in prolonged contact with them. Attacks are conducted after prolonged contact between the strawberry anemone's tentacles and rival species. The attack is done through releasing their mesenteries and attaching their mesenterial filaments, thin white strings that contain enzymes and toxins, with the rival species. With prolonged contact, they are able to kill off these species, and asexually reproduce to take over the space left behind. However, the strawberry anemone does not attack other members of its own species, a unique trait amongst surrounding anemone species.

The strawberry anemone also used their mesenterial filaments for other reasons, including assisting in the consumption of larger prey, or as a self-defence mechanism against predators such as Dermasterias imbricata.

== Habitat ==
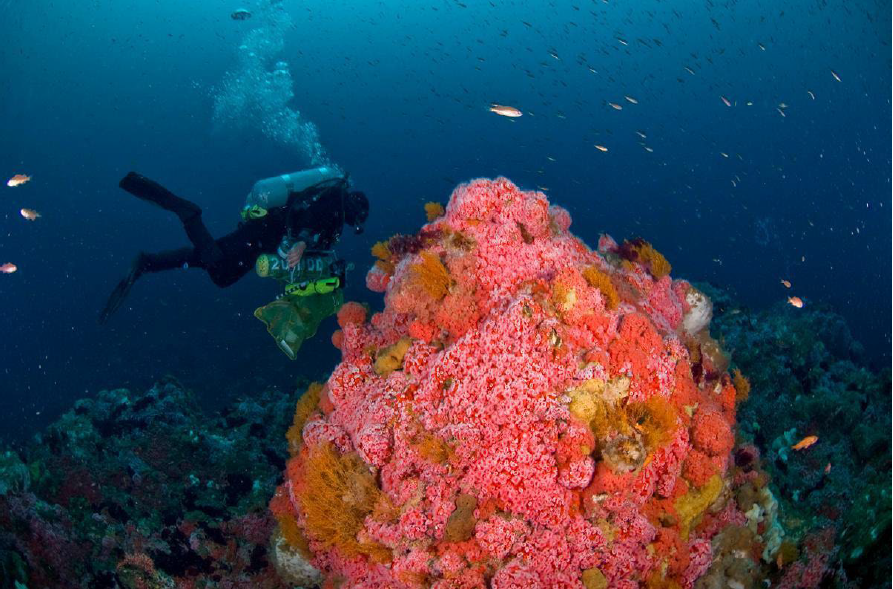
A research diver swims past a colony of Corynactis californica and orange hydroids (Garveia annulata ) in the Cordell Bank National Marine Sanctuary off California.

Studies conducted on Corynactis californica suggest that the anemone grows well under the canopies of macroalgae rather than outside of them. Species of macroalgae that the strawberry anemone live under include Macrocystis pyrifera and Eisenia arborea. Eisenia arborea may assist the anemone in protecting planktonic larvae, and directing food particles to polyps.
