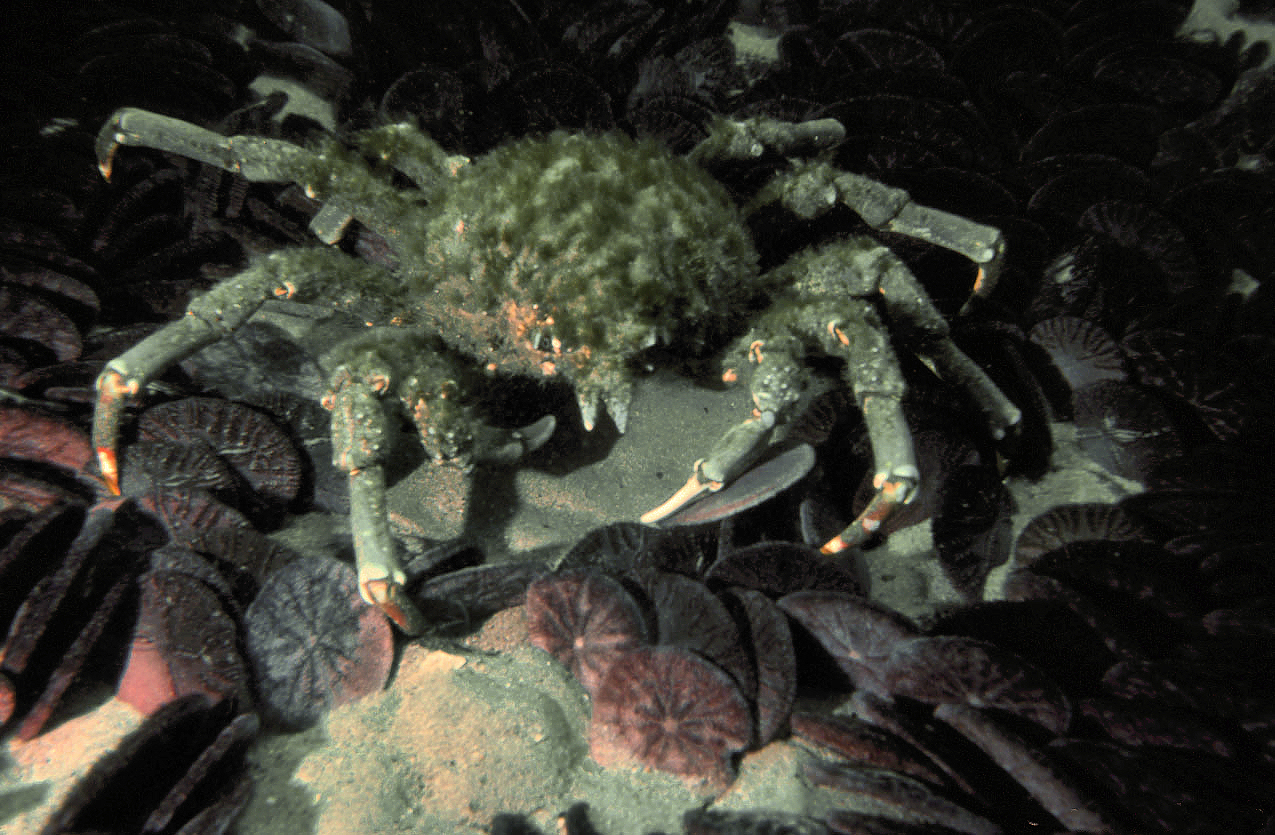
- Sheep crab, Loxorhynchus grandis

Scientific classification
- Domain: Eukaryota
- Kingdom: Animalia
- Phylum: Arthropoda
- Class: Malacostraca
- Order: Decapoda
- Suborder: Pleocyemata
- Infraorder: Brachyura
- Family: Epialtidae
- Subfamily: Pisinae
- Genus: Loxorhynchus; Stimpson, 1857

Species
- See text

= Loxorhynchus =

Genus of crabs

Loxorhynchus is a genus of crabs of the eastern Pacific Ocean in the family Epialtidae.

== Species ==
- Loxorhynchus crispatus Stimpson, 1857 — masking crab or moss crab
- Loxorhynchus grandis Stimpson, 1857 — sheep crab
- Loxorhynchus guinotae Hendrickx & Cervantes, 2003

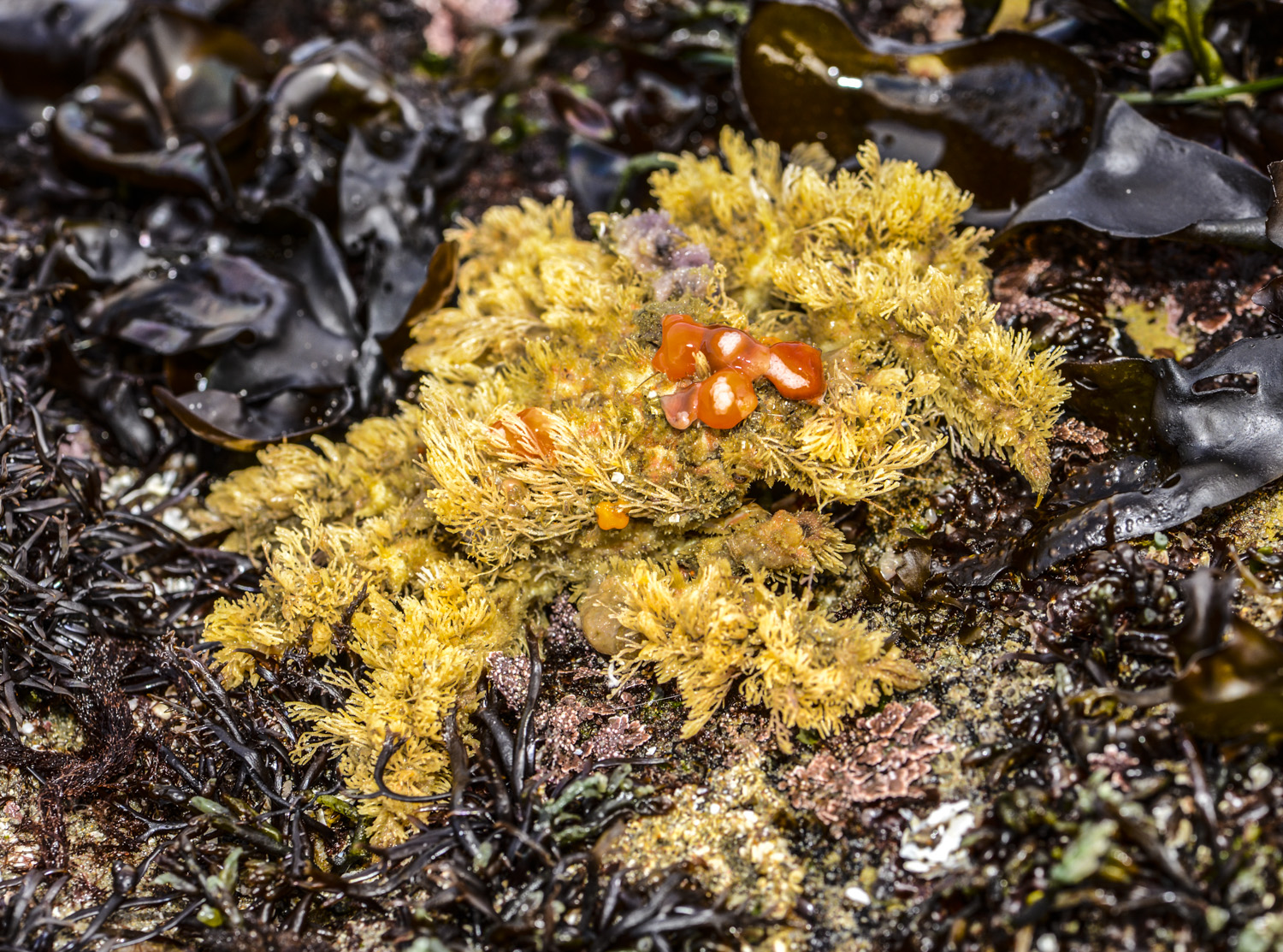
Loxorhynchus crispatus (Masking Crab). Note small red strawberry anemones on the crab's back.
