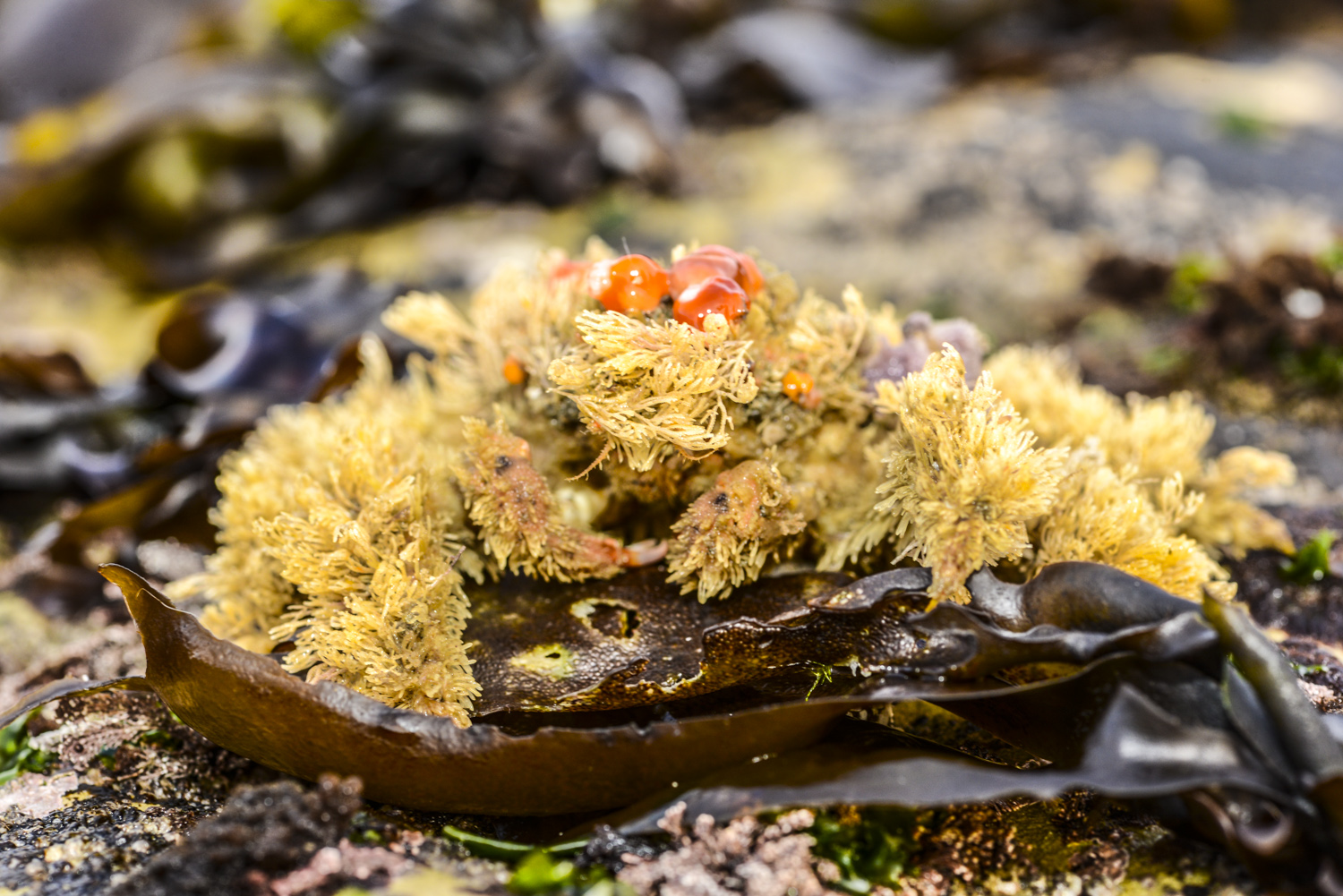

Scientific classification
- Kingdom: Animalia
- Phylum: Arthropoda
- Class: Malacostraca
- Order: Decapoda
- Suborder: Pleocyemata
- Infraorder: Brachyura
- Family: Epialtidae
- Genus: Loxorhynchus
- Species: L. crispatus

Binomial name
- Loxorhynchus crispatus Stimpson, 1857

= Loxorhynchus crispatus =

Species of crab

Loxorhynchus crispatus, known generally as the masking crab or moss crab, is a species of true crab in the family Epialtidae. It is found in the East Pacific.
