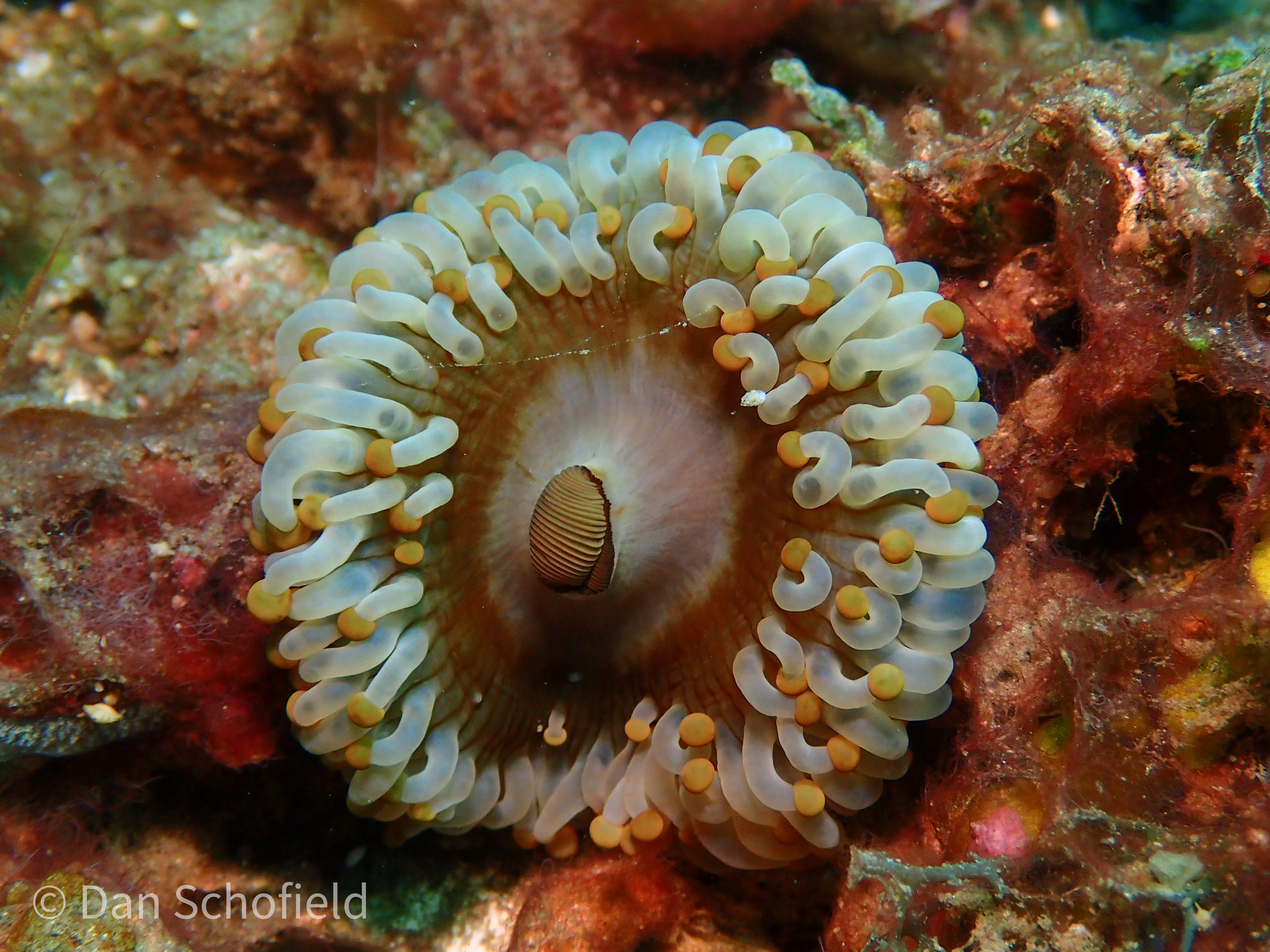

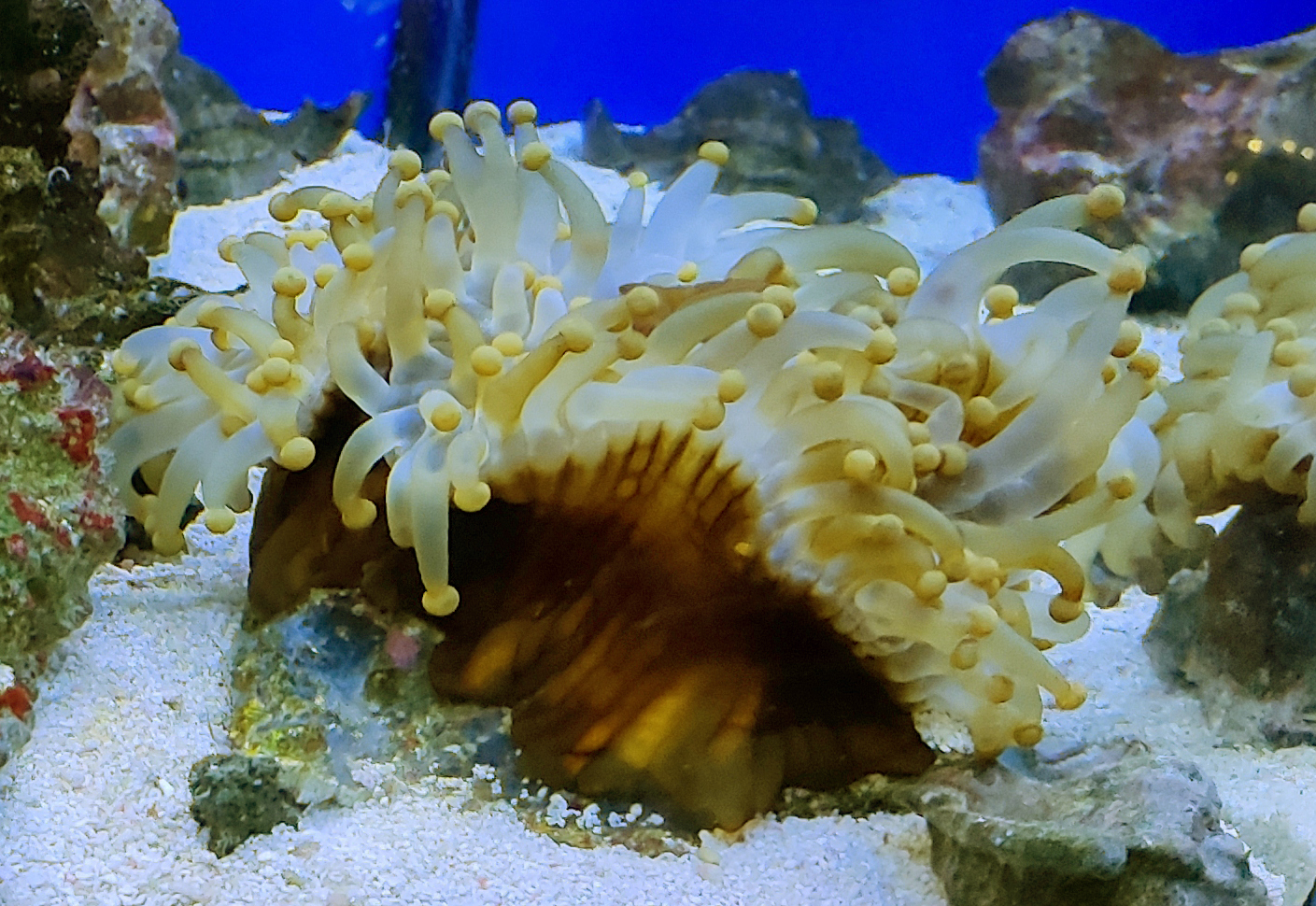

Scientific classification
- Kingdom: Animalia
- Phylum: Cnidaria
- Subphylum: Anthozoa
- Class: Hexacorallia
- Order: Corallimorpharia
- Family: Corallimorphidae
- Genus: Paracorynactis; Ocaña, den Hartog, Brito, & Bos, 2010
- Species: P. hoplites

Binomial name
- Paracorynactis hoplites (Haddon & Shackleton, 1893)

Synonyms
- Corynactis hoplites Haddon & Shackleton, 1893; Pseudocorynactis hoplites (Haddon & Shackleton, 1893)

= Paracorynactis =

Genus of corals

Paracorynactis is a genus of corallimorphs from the western Indo-West Pacific, possessing one known species; Paracorynactis hoplites. They are specialized predators of echinoderms, and are notable for preying on the destructive crown-of-thorns starfish (Acanthaster planci) among others. They are sometimes found in the aquarium trade.

== Nomenclature ==
P. hoplites is known as the giant ball corallimorph, (Note: Although this common name may also refer to Megacorynactis giganteus, which is itself a controversial taxon.) though many other names are also used in the aquarium trade, such as the giant reef corallimorph, ball tentacle anemone, and erroneously, orange ball anemone (predominantly used for Pseudocorynactis caribbeorum and Ps. tuberculata) and chocolate anemone.

=== Taxonomy ===
Paracorynactis hoplites is the only species classified under the genus Paracorynactis. It belongs to the family Corallimorphidae of the corralimorph order Corallimorpharia. It was first described as Corynactis hoplites by the British biologists Alfred Cort Haddon and Alice M. Shackleton in 1893.

In 1980, it was transferred by the Dutch marine biologist Jacobus Cornelis den Hartog to the newly created genus Pseudocorynactis. In 2010, Ocaña et al. noted the difference in tentacle development between this species and other members of the family Corallimorphidae. It was again transferred to a new genus, Paracorynactis.

== Description ==
Paracorynactis hoplites polyps can vary in diameter from as small as 2 mm (0.08 in) to as large as 21 cm (8 in), though there are anecdotal reports of specimens reaching 1 ft (0.30 metres) across, and specimens from Lizard Island only reach 10 cm (4 in) in diameter. Their tentacles end in extremely sticky balls (acrospheres) covered with stinging cells (nematocysts). Despite their color, they aren't photosynthetic like some other forms of coral.

== Distribution and habitat ==
Paracorynactis hoplites are known to occur in coral reefs in Australia, Indonesia, Malaysia, the Marshall Islands, Papua New Guinea, Philippines, and was recently encountered in Kenya. It occurs as far north as Okinawa.

Paracorynactis hoplites are usually attached in reef crevices and under coral ledges at a maximum depth of 28 m (92 ft), though most can be found within 1 to 10 m (3 to 33 ft) of the water's surface. Incidentally, these are areas which are also commonly used by their echinoderm prey for shelter.

== Ecology and behavior ==
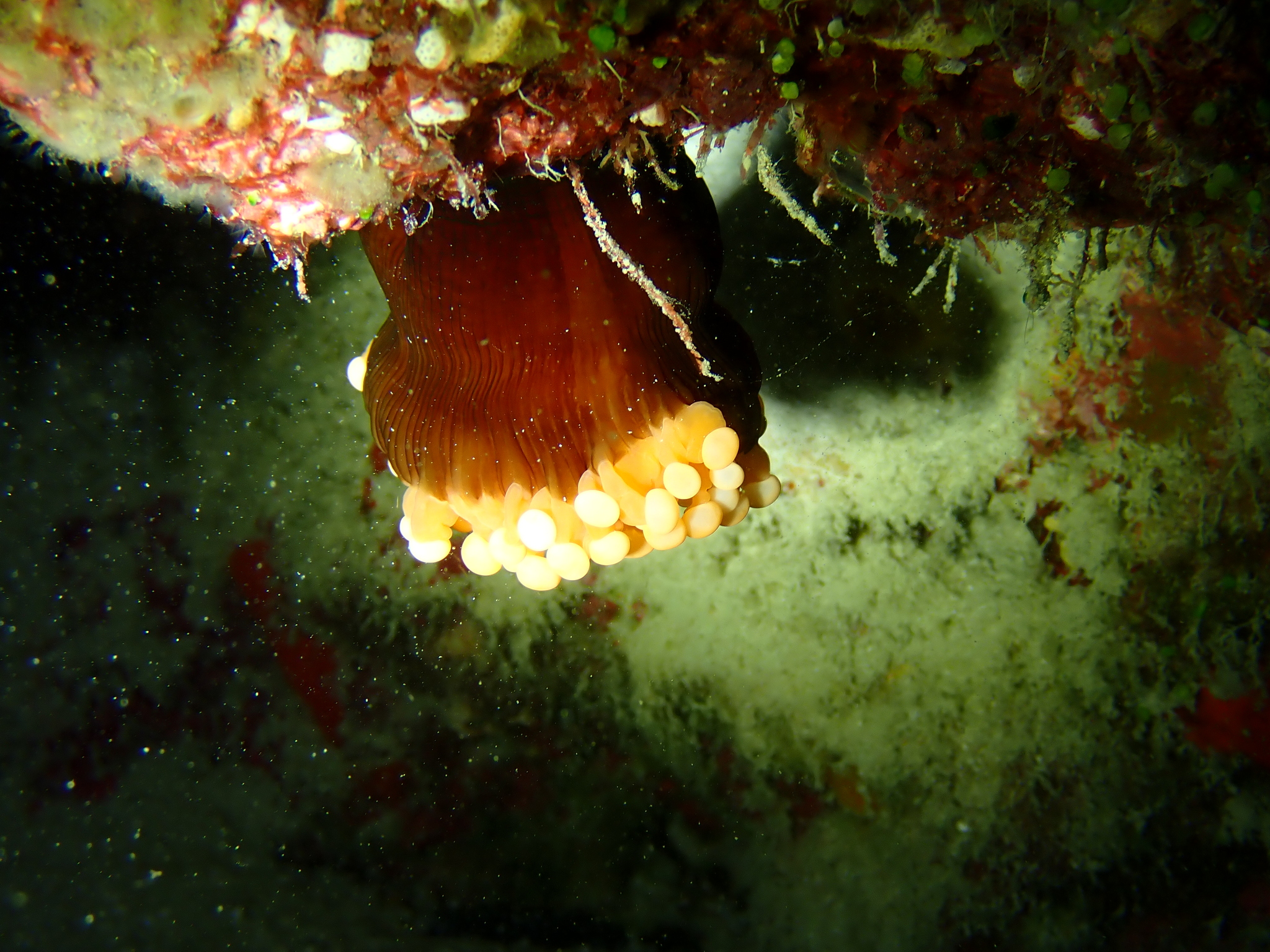
Vuatu Bay, Fiji

Paracorynactis hoplites polyps will continually move their tentacles in an effort to detect prey. When an acrosphere comes in contact with suitable prey, it will immediately stick unto the prey's skin while firing its stinging cells (nematocysts). The polyp then extends itself towards the prey, bringing all the other remaining acrospheres towards the prey until it is trapped. The body can extend to five times its normal length when doing this. The polyp will then slowly pull the prey towards its mouth and digest it. Once the soft tissues are dissolved, the undigestable pieces of the prey (e.g. spines) are regurgitated. Small prey are swallowed whole. Larger stiff-bodied prey can escape, though losing a few limbs in the process through autotomy. Captured large starfish, for example, usually only lose one arm.

Paracorynactis hoplites are highly efficient predators of echinoderms. They specialize in preying on sea stars and short-spined sea urchins, though they are also known to prey on sea cucumbers, brittle stars, and nudibranchs to a lesser extent, which indicates that they are able to prey upon all soft-bodied slow-moving animals. They are also believed to supplement their diet with plankton when prey is scarce, akin to other corallimorphs and sea anemones.

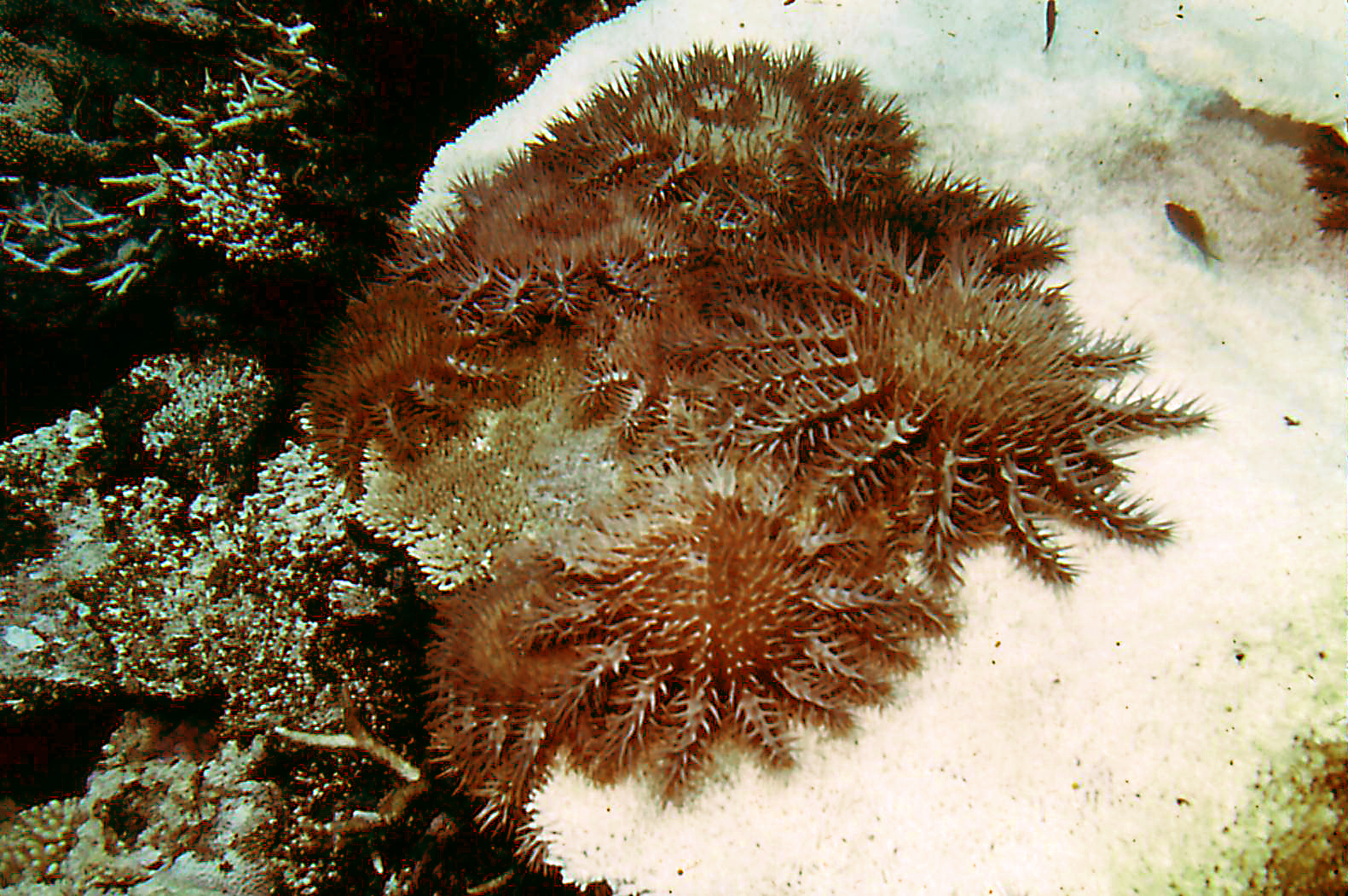
The crown of thorns starfish (Acanthaster planci) falls prey to P. hoplites

Paracorynactis hoplites is able to capture and consume large and highly defended sea stars like horned sea stars (Protoreaster nodosus) and crown-of-thorns starfish (Acanthaster planci). Polyps 170 mm (7 in) in diameter have been observed capturing sea stars as large as 340 mm (13 in) across. P. hoplites also do not seem to be affected by the toxins of venomous echinoderms like the aforementioned crown-of-thorns starfish and the flower urchin (Toxopneustes pileolus), both of which are toxic to humans, fish, and other marine predators.

Animals with smooth shells or long spines generally seem to be rejected as prey by Paracorynactis hoplites polyps. Among these are long-spined sea urchins like Diadema setosum, Diadema savignyi, and Echinothrix calamaris. Brittle stars of the genus Ophiomastix as well as shelled gastropods are also not attacked. They will also reject prey when having recently fed.

Paracorynactis hoplites are also used as hosts by several symbiotic species of cleaner shrimp that aren't affected by their stinging cells. These include Thor amboinensis (sexy shrimp), Stenopus hispidus (banded coral shrimp), Ancylomenes holthuisi, and Cuapetes lacertae. Several species of fish have also been observed living among the tentacles of Paracorynactis hoplites with no adverse effects. These commensals include cardinalfish like Ostorhinchus multilineatus (multi-striped cardinalfish), Ostorhinchus nigrofasciatus (blackstripe cardinalfish), and Cheilodipterus quinquelineatus (five-lined cardinalfish) along with gobies like Trimma nasa (nasal dwarfgoby) and Eviota pellucida (neon pygmy goby).

== Relation to humans ==
This corallimorph is sometimes found in the aquarium trade, though it isn't commonly traded.

Paracorynactis hoplites is not assessed by conservation authorities such as the IUCN, though this species may prove valuable as natural population control measures for the highly ecologically destructive crown-of-thorns starfish.
