= Sideractinidae =

Scientific classification
- Kingdom: Animalia
- Phylum: Cnidaria
- Subphylum: Anthozoa
- Class: Hexacorallia
- Order: Corallimorpharia
- Family: Sideractinidae

Synonyms
- Sideractiidae

Family of corals

Sideractinidae is a family of corals belonging to the order Corallimorpharia.

Genera:

- Nectactis Gravier, 1918
- Sideractis Danielssen, 1890
