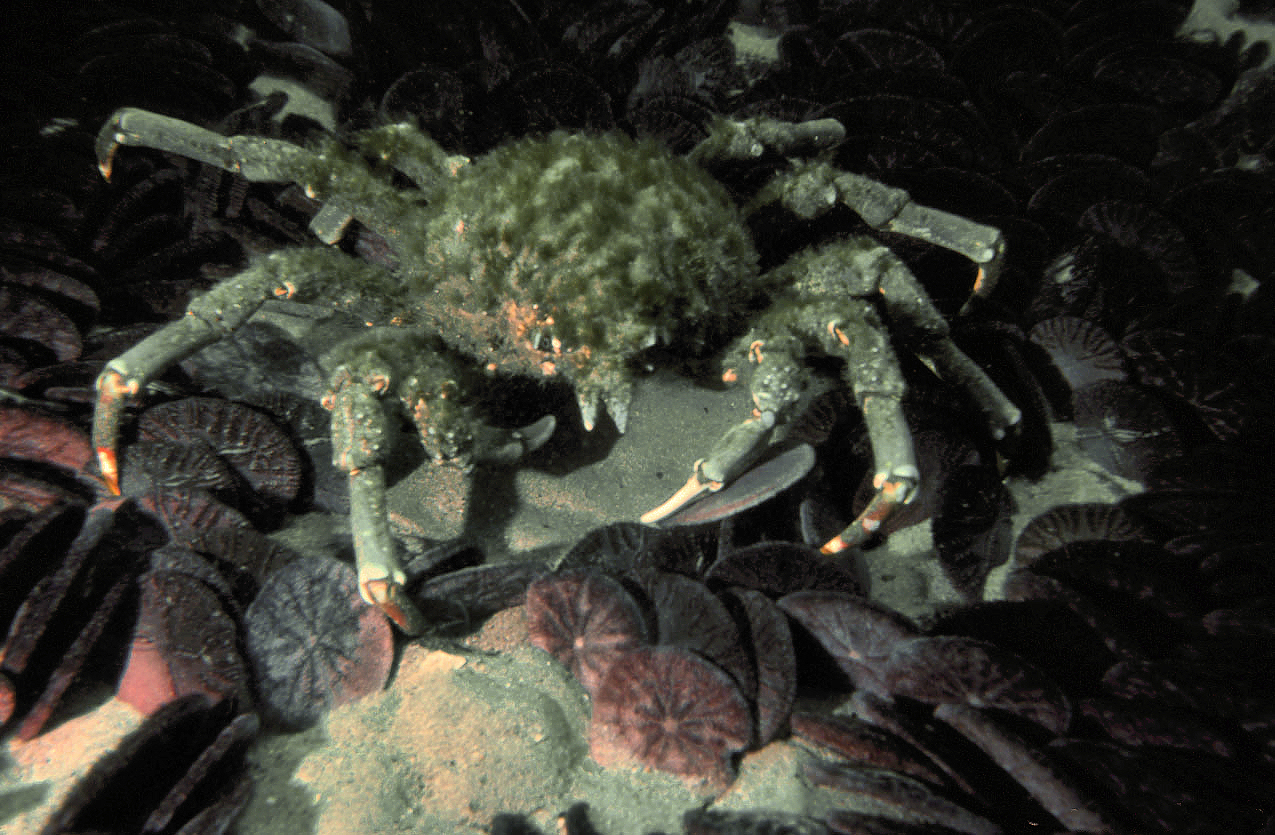

Scientific classification
- Kingdom: Animalia
- Phylum: Arthropoda
- Clade: Pancrustacea
- Class: Malacostraca
- Order: Decapoda
- Suborder: Pleocyemata
- Infraorder: Brachyura
- Family: Epialtidae
- Genus: Loxorhynchus
- Species: L. grandis

Binomial name
- Loxorhynchus grandis Stimpson, 1857

= Loxorhynchus grandis =

Species of crab

Loxorhynchus grandis, commonly known as the sheep crab or spider crab, is a species of crab in the family Epialtidae. It is the largest crab found on the California coast. The species was first described to science by William Stimpson in 1857. The type specimen was collected on the coast of California, near San Francisco. Fossils from the late Miocene epoch indicate that this species is at least 11.63 to 5.333 million years old.

== Description ==
The sheep crab has a carapace, four sets of walking legs, and a set of claws, or chelipeds. Males are larger than females. The carapace of a male can be over 9.6 inches (24 cm) across, while females can grow to 6.8 inches (17 cm). The carapace is tear-shaped with a wide, rounded posterior which tapers to a point at its snout, or rostrum. There is an obvious preorbital spine on the tip of the rostrum, which is sharply down-curved and deeply notched at its tip. The carapace is covered in short spines, or tubercles.

The longest legs, the second pair of walking legs, is longer than the carapace is wide, so sheep crabs can reach an overall width of 57 centimetres (22 in).

While the exoskeleton, or shell, is reddish, brown, or blue-green, this is often masked. Young crabs deliberately attach algae, bryozoans, hydroids, sponges, and other creatures to their exoskeletons as a form of camouflage to hide from predators. Animals larger than 8 centimetres (3.1 in) cease to decorate themselves. This species stops molting when it reaches sexual maturity, however, and a layer of algae often develops on the long-lived adult exoskeleton, giving these crabs a green appearance.

== Distribution and habitat ==
This crab lives in coastal waters from Cordell Bank, California to Punta San Bartolome, Baja California. It is found in waters between 6 metres (20 ft) and 152 metres (499 ft) deep. Sheep crabs are quite mobile, achieving speeds of 0.4 kilometres per hour (0.25 mph), foraging on soft and rocky bottoms, as well as pilings. This species is migratory, spending the warm months of the year in shallow waters and the cooler months in deeper waters.

== Reproduction and life history ==
Sheep crabs are gonochoric, which is to say that individuals are either male or female. They form aggregations, piles of dozens or hundreds of crabs. The aggregations which have been studied in detail are composed only of adults and included females and at least one male. Sheep crabs are typically solitary, and it has been hypothesized that the purpose of the aggregations is to increase the concentration of a chemical signal, a pheromone, from the females to attract males for mating.

A male crab grasps a female for mating and delivers a sperm packet. A female can store sperm for later use, if no males are available. Fertilization takes place internally, and the fertilized eggs are then glued to the exterior of the female's abdomen. Females brood their eggs to protect them from predation. Broods may contain 125,000 to 500,000 eggs. The development of the eggs can be discerned by their color. Orange eggs are the freshest, red are of intermediate development, and brown can be seen to have eyes and are ready to be released. Brooding females have been found year-round suggesting that there is no strong seasonal peak in reproduction. The length of the brooding period is unknown.

After release from the female, larval crabs are free swimming plankton. They settle to the bottom and become recognizable sheep crabs when they reach about 1 centimetre (0.39 in) across.

The sheep crab has a rigid and thick exoskeleton which presents an obstacle to growth. The shell cannot grow even if the animal inside it does. Like most other crabs, this species solves this issue by periodically molting its shell. It first forms a soft shell inside the existing exoskeleton. It then opens a slit at the rear of the carapace and backs out of the old shell. The new, soft shell is then vigorously inflated with water and it hardens at this inflated size. The animal then has plenty of room to grow inside the new shell simply by displacing the water. This strategy also has the benefit of allowing the animal to regenerate limbs that have been lost since its last molt. Unlike many crabs, the sheep crab ceases to molt when it attains sexual maturity. This terminal molt ends its ability to grow and regenerate limbs.

The maximum life of this crab is unknown, but is at least three years.

== Diet ==
The sheep crab is a scavenger-generalist in diet, eating algae, mussels, sea stars, small crabs, including juvenile sheep crabs and northern kelp crabs, and dead fish.

== Predators ==
Sheep crabs are preyed upon by sea otters, cabezon, California sheephead, octopus, sharks, bat rays, California sea lions, and larger sheep crabs.

== Fishery ==
In the late 1970s a commercial fishery for sheep crabs developed in California. Two markets emerged, one for the large claws of the male crabs, and another for whole crabs. The fishery peaked in 1988 when 96,000 pounds of claws and 108,000 pounds of whole crabs were landed. In 1990, a California ballot initiative banned the use of gill nets and trammel nets that were used to catch sheep crabs, and the fishery shrank significantly. In 2018, California reported commercial landings of 503 pounds of claws and 74,863 pounds of whole crabs.

Sheep crab are taken as bycatch in the California spiny lobster fishery. One study found 1.29% of the animals caught in lobster traps were sheep crabs.
