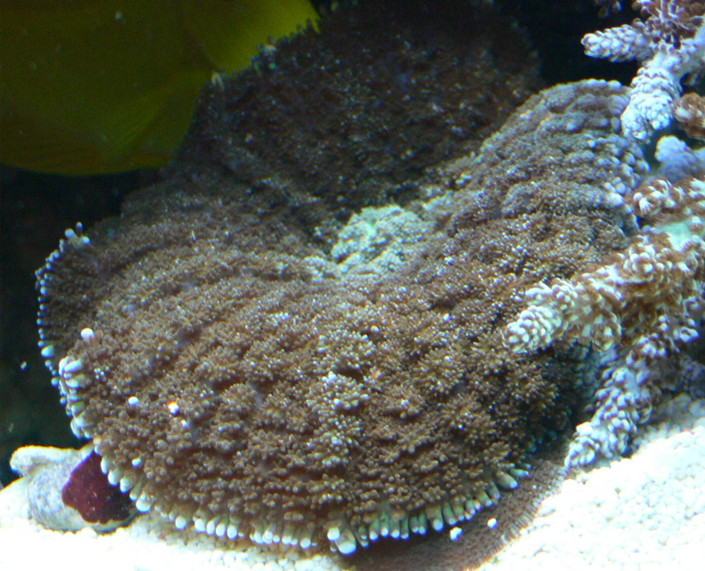
- Rhodactis inchoata

Scientific classification
- Domain: Eukaryota
- Kingdom: Animalia
- Phylum: Cnidaria
- Subphylum: Anthozoa
- Class: Hexacorallia
- Order: Corallimorpharia
- Family: Discosomidae
- Genus: Rhodactis; Milne Edwards & Haime, 1851

Species
- See text

Synonyms
- Rodactis

= Rhodactis =

Genus of corals

Rhodactis is the genus of Corallimorpharia which is characterized by large individual polyps that are often reminiscent of a mushroom. Rhodactis are related to stony corals but do not produce a stony skeleton.

== Species ==
The following species are recognized in the genus Rhodactis:

- Rhodactis bryoides Haddon & Shackleton, 1893
- Rhodactis howesii Saville-Kent, 1893
- Rhodactis inchoata Carlgren, 1943
- Rhodactis indosinensis Carlgren, 1943
- Rhodactis musciformis Duchassaing & Michelotti, 1864
- Rhodactis osculifera (Le Sueur, 1817)
- Rhodactis rhodostoma (Hemprich & Ehrenberg in Ehrenberg, 1834)
