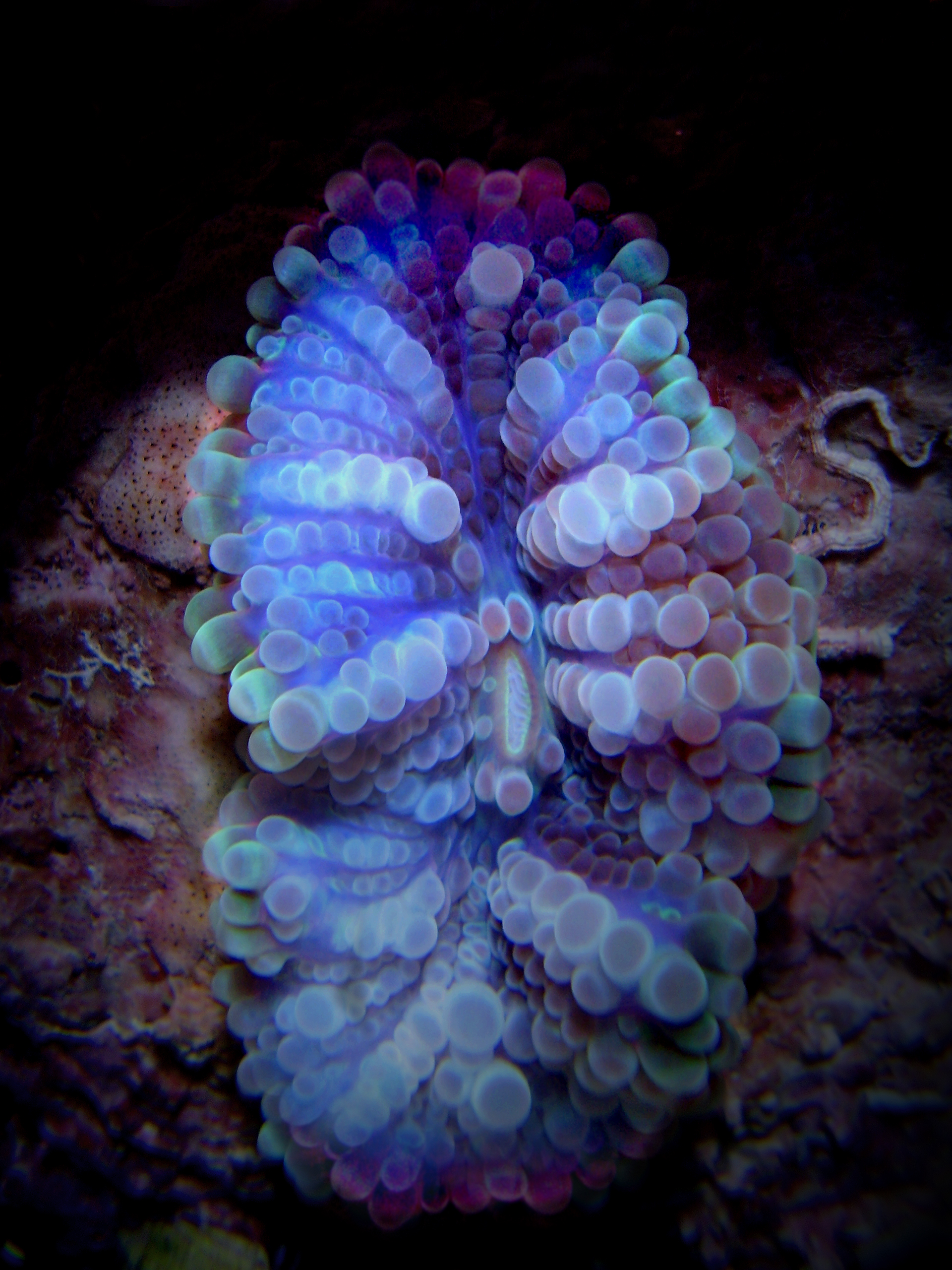
- Ricordea yuma

Scientific classification
- Kingdom: Animalia
- Phylum: Cnidaria
- Subphylum: Anthozoa
- Class: Hexacorallia
- Order: Corallimorpharia
- Family: Ricordeidae; Watzl, 1922
- Genus: Ricordea; Duchassaing de Fonbressin & Michelotti, 1860

Species
- See text

Synonyms
- Ricordia

= Ricordea =

Genus of corals

Ricordea is genus of corals. It is the only genus in the monotypic family Ricordeidae.

== Species ==
The following species are recognized in the genus Ricordea:

- Ricordea florida Duchassaing & Michelotti, 1860
- Ricordea yuma (Carlgren, 1900)
