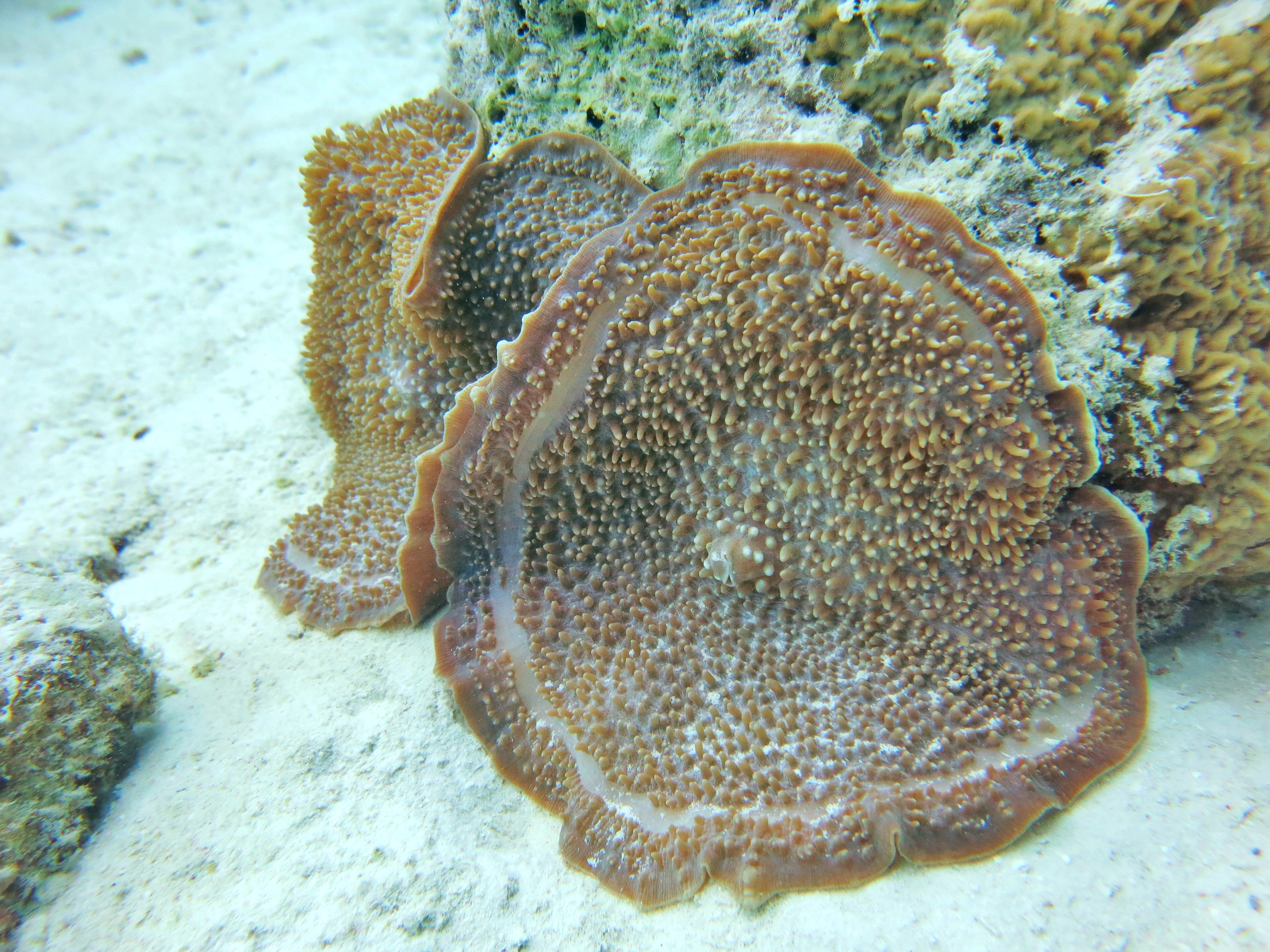

Scientific classification
- Kingdom: Animalia
- Phylum: Cnidaria
- Subphylum: Anthozoa
- Class: Hexacorallia
- Order: Corallimorpharia
- Family: Discosomidae
- Genus: Amplexidiscus; Dunn & Hamner, 1980
- Species: A. fenestrafer

Binomial name
- Amplexidiscus fenestrafer Dunn & Hamner, 1980

Synonyms
- Discosoma fenestrafera (Dunn & Hamner, 1980)

= Amplexidiscus =

Amplexidiscus fenestrafer

Genus of sea anemones

Amplexidiscus fenestrafer, also known as the elephant ear anemone, is a species of coral belonging to the phylum Cnidaria. The name "elephant ear anemone" is a misnomer because it is actually a species of coral. It is the only species in the monotypic genus Amplexidiscus.

== Description ==
The visible part of its body corresponds to its oral region and forms a flexible disc, when it is deployed, endowed with cone-shaped tentacles. Its diameter can reach 40 centimetres (16 in) and its coloration is light beige to brown.

== Distribution & habitat ==
This coral is often forming small colony in 5–25 metres (16–82 ft) depth on the top reef in tropical waters Indo-West Pacific area.

== Feeding ==
Its diet is highly varied and goes from the production of its zooxanthellae to numerous animals which find themselves trapped by the oral disk as benthic invertebrates, crustaceans, worms, echinoderms and even fishes. When the prey is trapped and the anemone is starting its digestion, the lobed edges are raised towards the center of the disk and form a ball.
