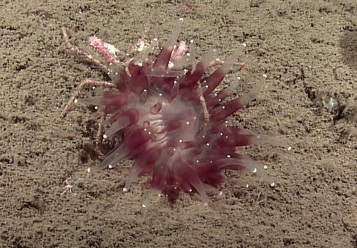
- Corallimorphus pilatus

Scientific classification
- Kingdom: Animalia
- Phylum: Cnidaria
- Subphylum: Anthozoa
- Class: Hexacorallia
- Order: Corallimorpharia
- Family: Corallimorphidae
- Genus: Corallimorphus; Moseley, 1877

= Corallimorphus =

Genus of cnidarians

Corallimorphus is a genus of colonial anthozoans similar in appearance to sea anemones and in body format to scleractinian stony corals. These animals are cnidarians in the family Corallimorphidae. Members of the genus live off the Pacific coast of the US.

== Species ==
Species so far described in this genus include:

- Corallimorphus denhartogi Fautin, White & Pearson, 2002
- Corallimorphus ingens Gravier, 1918
- Corallimorphus niwa Fautin, 2011
- Corallimorphus pilatus Fautin, White & Pearson, 2002
- Corallimorphus profundus Moseley, 1877
- Corallimorphus rigidus Moseley, 1877
