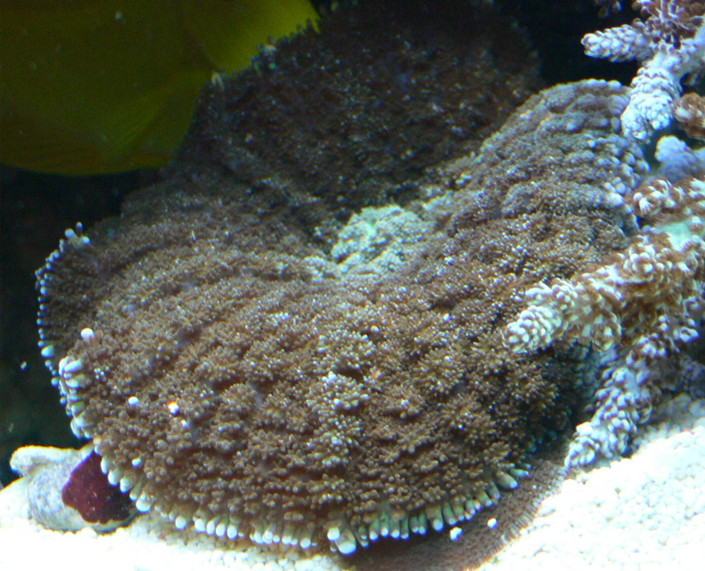
- Rhodactis inchoata, a species in the genus Rhodactis.

Scientific classification
- Kingdom: Animalia
- Phylum: Cnidaria
- Subphylum: Anthozoa
- Class: Hexacorallia
- Order: Corallimorpharia
- Family: Discosomidae; Verrill, 1869

Synonyms
- Discosomae Duchassaing de Fombressin & Michelotti, 1864; Discosomatidae Duchassaing de Fombressin & Michelotti, 1864; Discostominae Verrill, 1869; Rhodactidae Andres, 1883; Phialactidae Fowler, 1888; Actinodiscidae Carlgren, 1949

= Discosomidae =

Family of sea anemones

Discosomidae is a family of marine cnidarians closely related to the true sea anemones (Actiniaria). It contains five genera:

- Amplexidiscus
- Discosoma
- Metarhodactis
- Platyzoanthus
- Rhodactis
