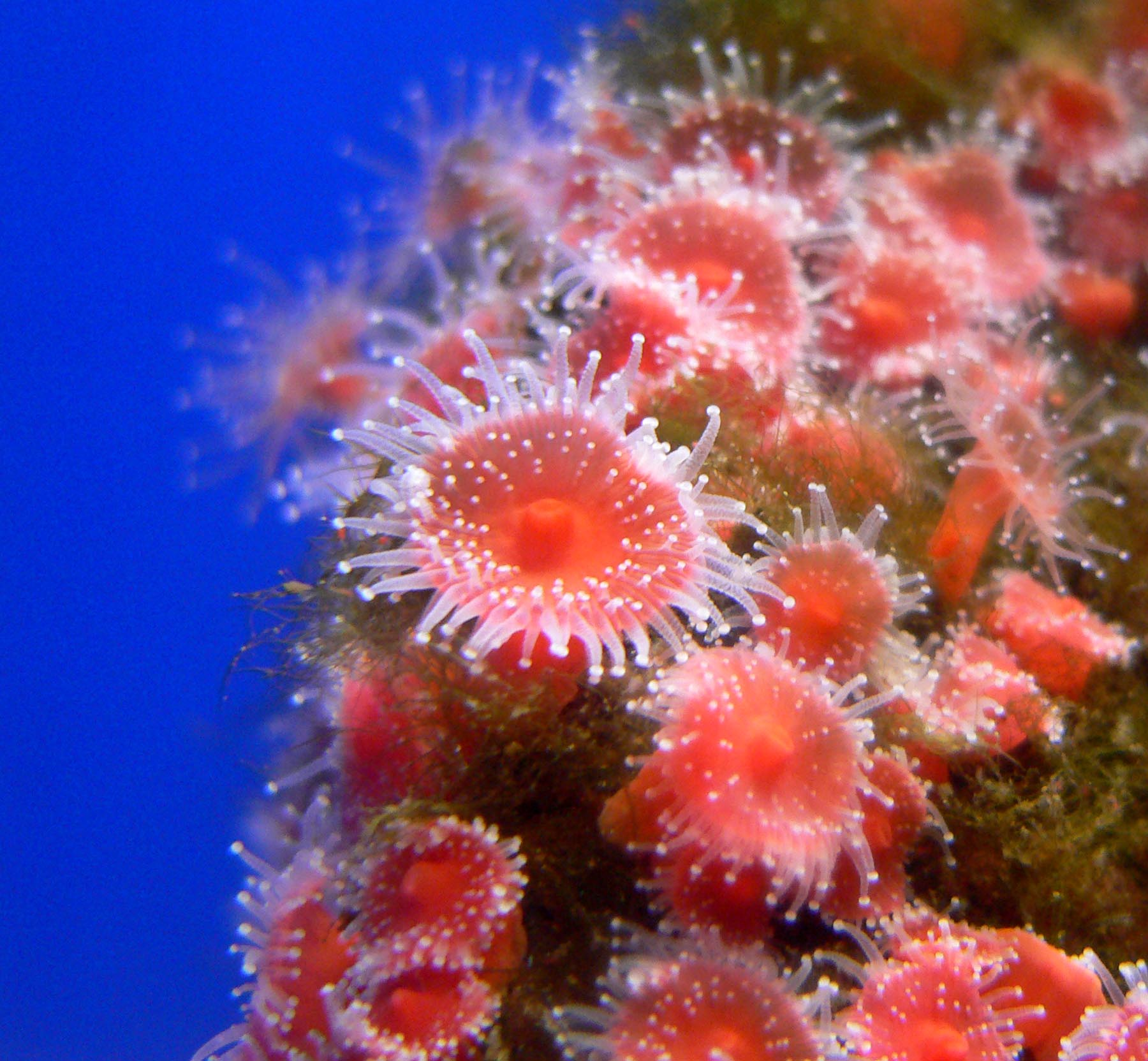
- Corynactis californica

Scientific classification
- Kingdom: Animalia
- Phylum: Cnidaria
- Subphylum: Anthozoa
- Class: Hexacorallia
- Order: Corallimorpharia
- Family: Corallimorphidae
- Genus: Corynactis; Allman, 1846

Synonyms
- Draytonia Duchassaing de Fombressin & Michelotti, 1864; Pseudocorynactis den Hartog, 1980; Sphincteractis Zamponi, 1976

= Corynactis =

Genus of animals similar to sea anemones

Corynactis is a genus of colonial anthozoans similar in appearance to sea anemones and in body format to scleractinian stony corals. These animals are cnidarians in the family Corallimorphidae. A species thought to belong to this genus feed on the crown-of-thorns seastar Acanthaster planci and may help control the crown-of-thorns population, but these are now known as Paracorynactis hoplites.

== Species ==
Species so far described in this genus include:

- Corynactis annulata Verrill, 1867
- Corynactis australis Haddon & Duerden, 1896
- Corynactis caboverdensis den Hartog, Ocaña & Brito, 1993
- Corynactis californica Carlgren, 1936
- Corynactis caribbeorum den Hartog, 1980
- Corynactis carnea Studer, 1879
- Corynactis chilensis Carlgren, 1941
- Corynactis delawarei Widersten, 1976
- Corynactis denhartogi Ocaña, 2003
- Corynactis denticulosa Le Sueur, 1817
- Corynactis globulifera Hemprich & Ehrenberg in Ehrenberg, 1834
- Corynactis parvula Duchassaing & Michelotti, 1860
- Corynactis sanmatiensis (Zamponi, 1976)
- Corynactis viridis Allman, 1846

== Feeding ==
Corynactis, like other corals in the phylum Corallimorpharia, depend highly on their production of zooxanthellae and numerous animals which find themselves trapped by the oral disk as benthic invertebrates, crustaceans, worms, echinoderms and even fishes. They are very aggressive eaters, which allows for them to feed on larger particles in the water column.
