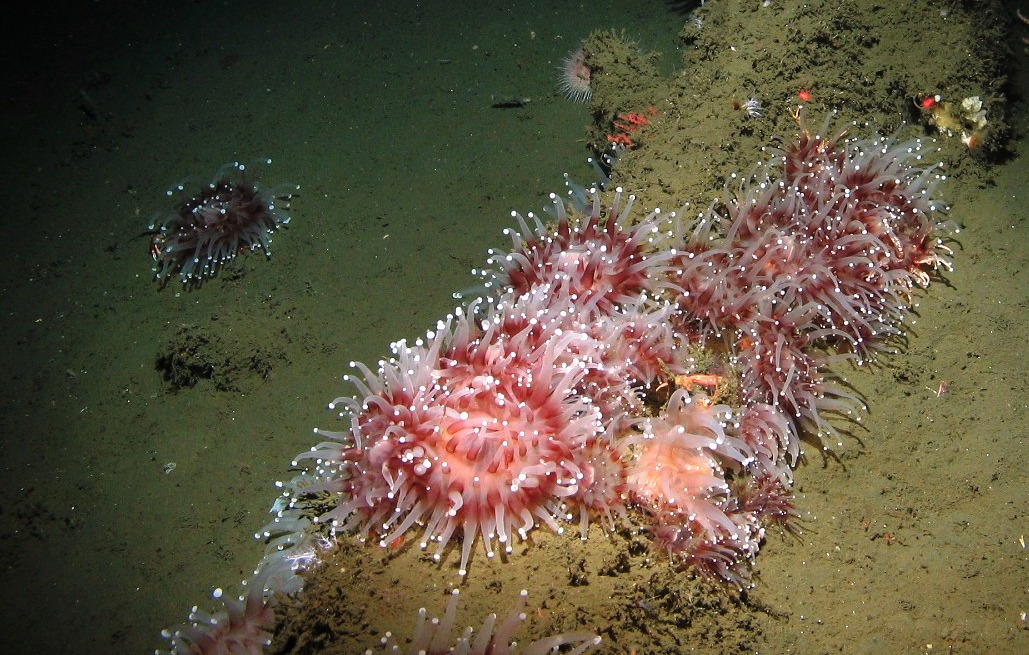

Scientific classification
- Kingdom: Animalia
- Phylum: Cnidaria
- Subphylum: Anthozoa
- Class: Hexacorallia
- Order: Corallimorpharia
- Family: Corallimorphidae; Hertwig, 1882

Genera
- See text

= Corallimorphidae =

Family of corals

Corallimorphidae is a family of corallimorphs. It includes three genera:

- Corallimorphus Moseley, 1877 - 6 species
- Corynactis Allman, 1846 - 14 species
- Paracorynactis Ocaña, den Hartog, Brito, & Bos, 2010 - 1 species
