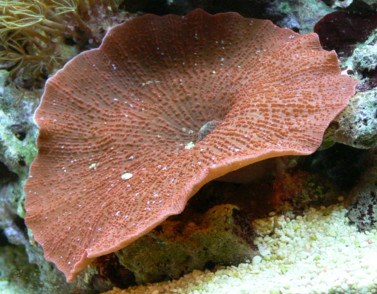

Scientific classification
- Kingdom: Animalia
- Phylum: Cnidaria
- Subphylum: Anthozoa
- Class: Hexacorallia
- Order: Corallimorpharia; Stephenson, 1937

Families
- Corallimorphidae; Discosomidae; Ricordeidae; Sideractinidae

Synonyms
- Coralliomorpharia

= Corallimorpharia =

Order of marine cnidarians closely related to stony corals

Corallimorpharia is an order of marine cnidarians closely related to stony or reef building corals (Scleractinia). They occur in both temperate and tropical climates, although they are mostly tropical. Temperate forms tend to be very robust, with wide and long columns, whereas tropical forms tend to have very short columns with a wide oral disc and very short tentacles. The tentacles are usually arranged in rows radiating from the mouth. Many species occur together in large groups, although there are recorded instances of individuals. In many respects, they resemble the stony corals, except for the absence of a stony skeleton. Morphological and molecular evidence suggests that they are very closely related to stony corals.

Corallimorpharians occur in a wide range of marine habitats, and can be associated with phase shifts in coral reef ecosystems that result in a change from a hard-coral dominated reef to a soft-coral dominated one. They have been observed to overgrow reefs in a carpet formation. Many species are also common invertebrates kept in marine aquaria.

== Taxonomy ==
According to World Register of Marine Species, this order contains 46 species within 11 genera:

- Family Corallimorphidae Hertwig, 1882
  - Genus Corallimorphus Moseley, 1877 -- 6 species
  - Genus Corynactis Allman, 1846 -- 14 species
  - Genus Paracorynactis Ocaña, den Hartog, Brito & Bos, 2010 -- 1 species
- Family Discosomidae Verrill, 1869
  - Genus Amplexidiscus Dunn & Hamner, 1980 -- 1 species
  - Genus Discosoma Rüppell & Leuckart, 1828 -- 11 species
  - Genus Metarhodactis Carlgren, 1943 -- 1 species
  - Genus Platyzoanthus Saville-Kent, 1893 -- 1 species
  - Genus Rhodactis Milne Edwards & Haime, 1851 -- 7 species
- Family Ricordeidae Watzl, 1922
  - Genus Ricordea Duchassaing de Fonbressin & Michelotti, 1860 -- 2 species
- Family Sideractinidae Danielssen, 1890
  - Genus Nectactis Gravier, 1918 -- 1 species
  - Genus Sideractis Danielssen, 1890 -- 1 species
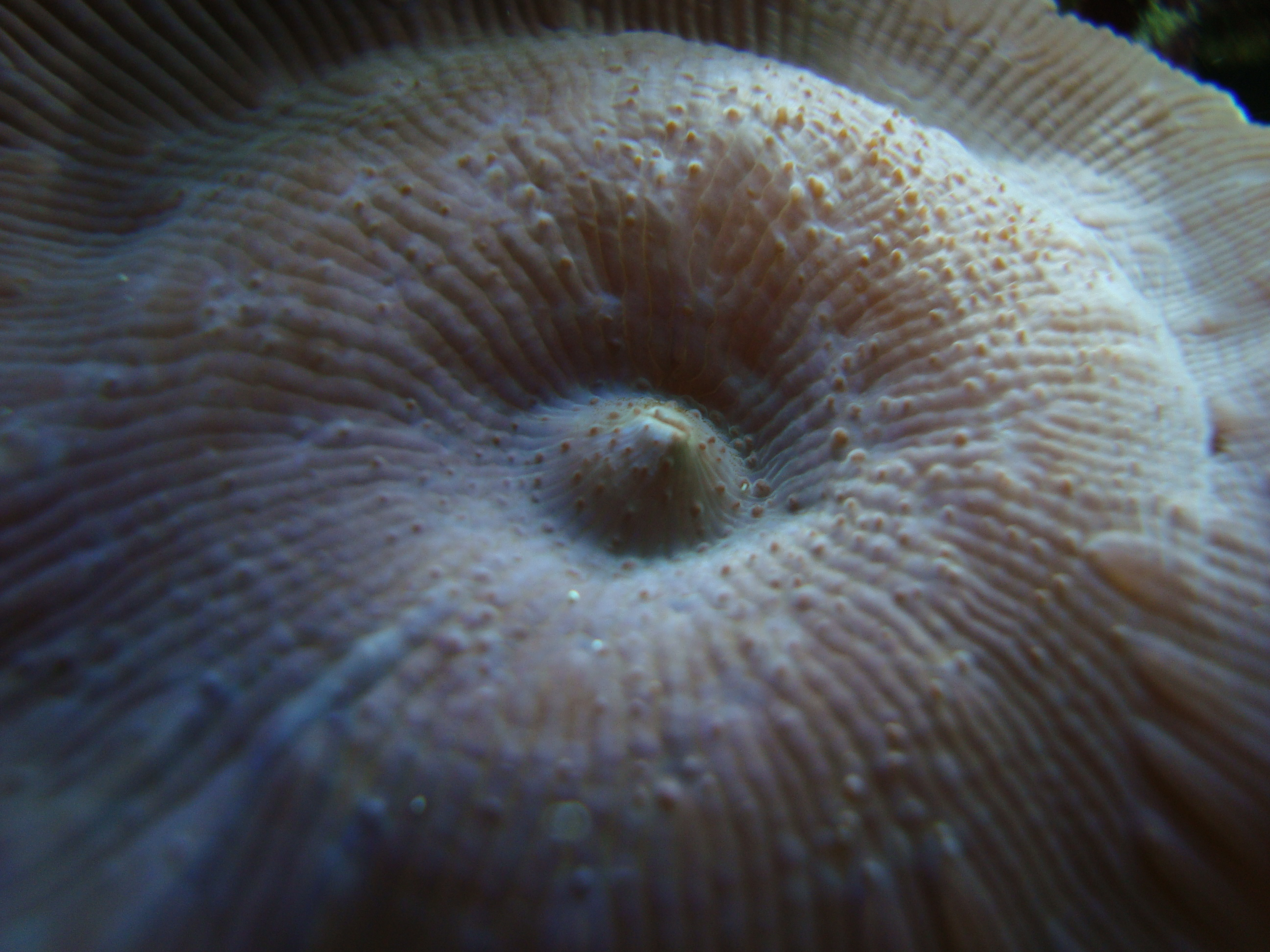
Actinodiscus sp.

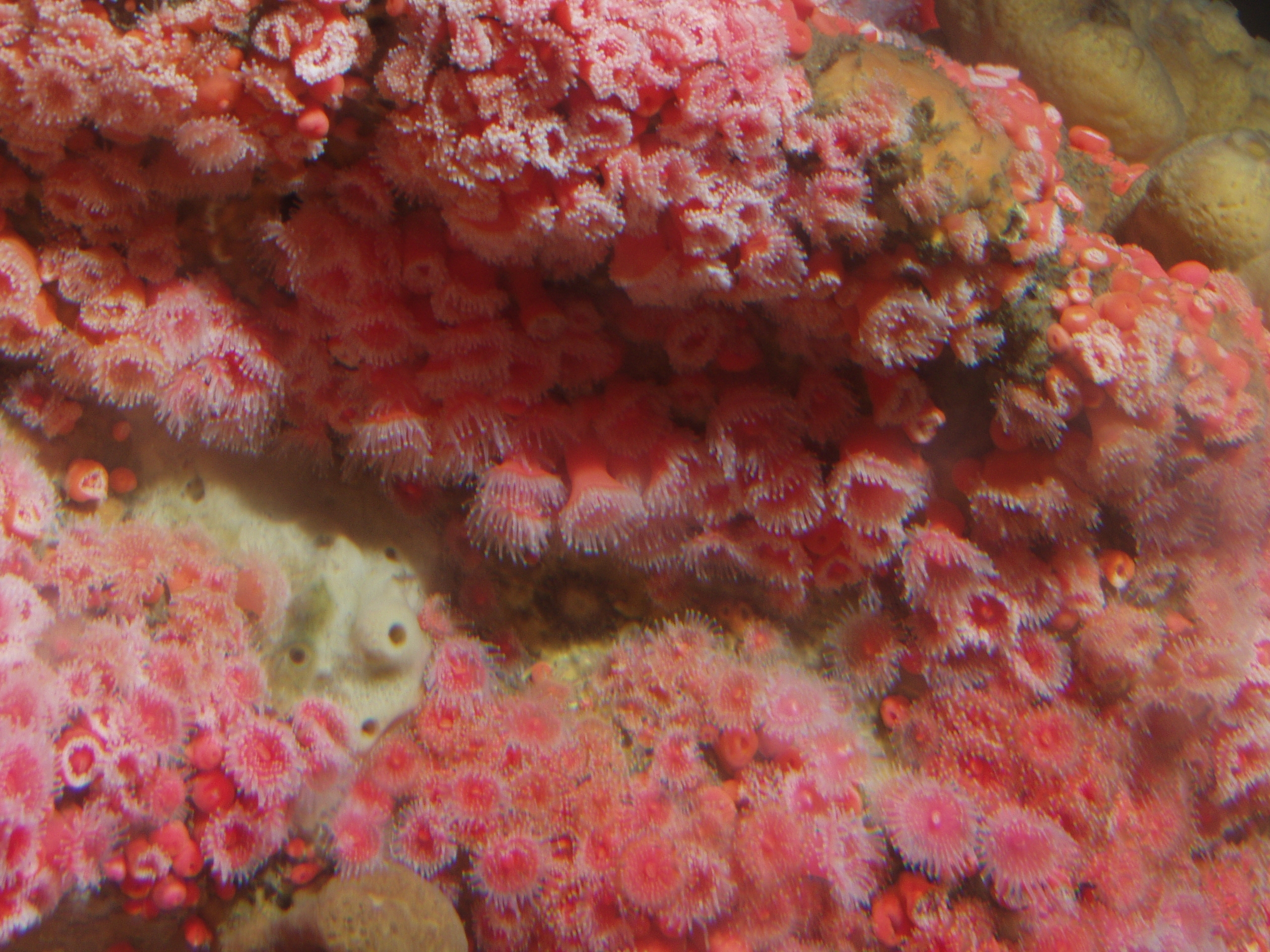
Corynactis californica

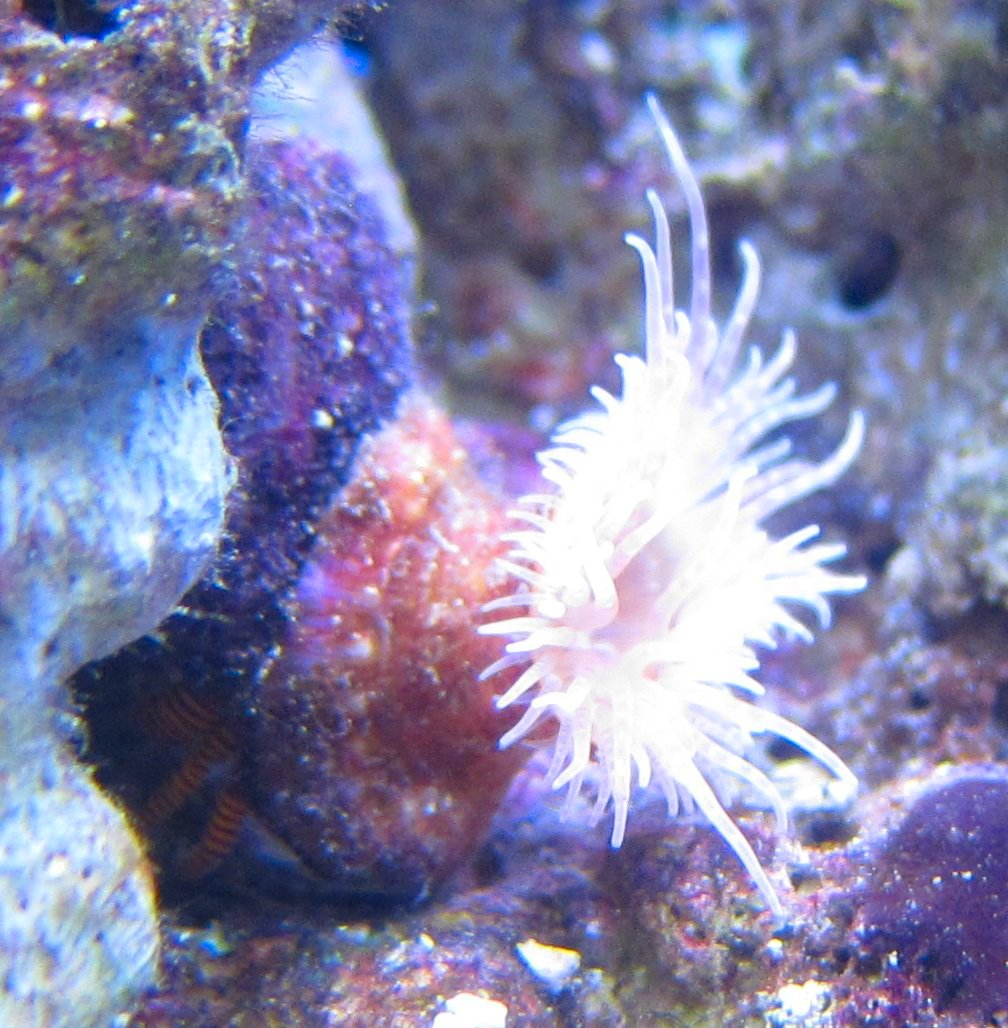
Pseudocorynactis sp.

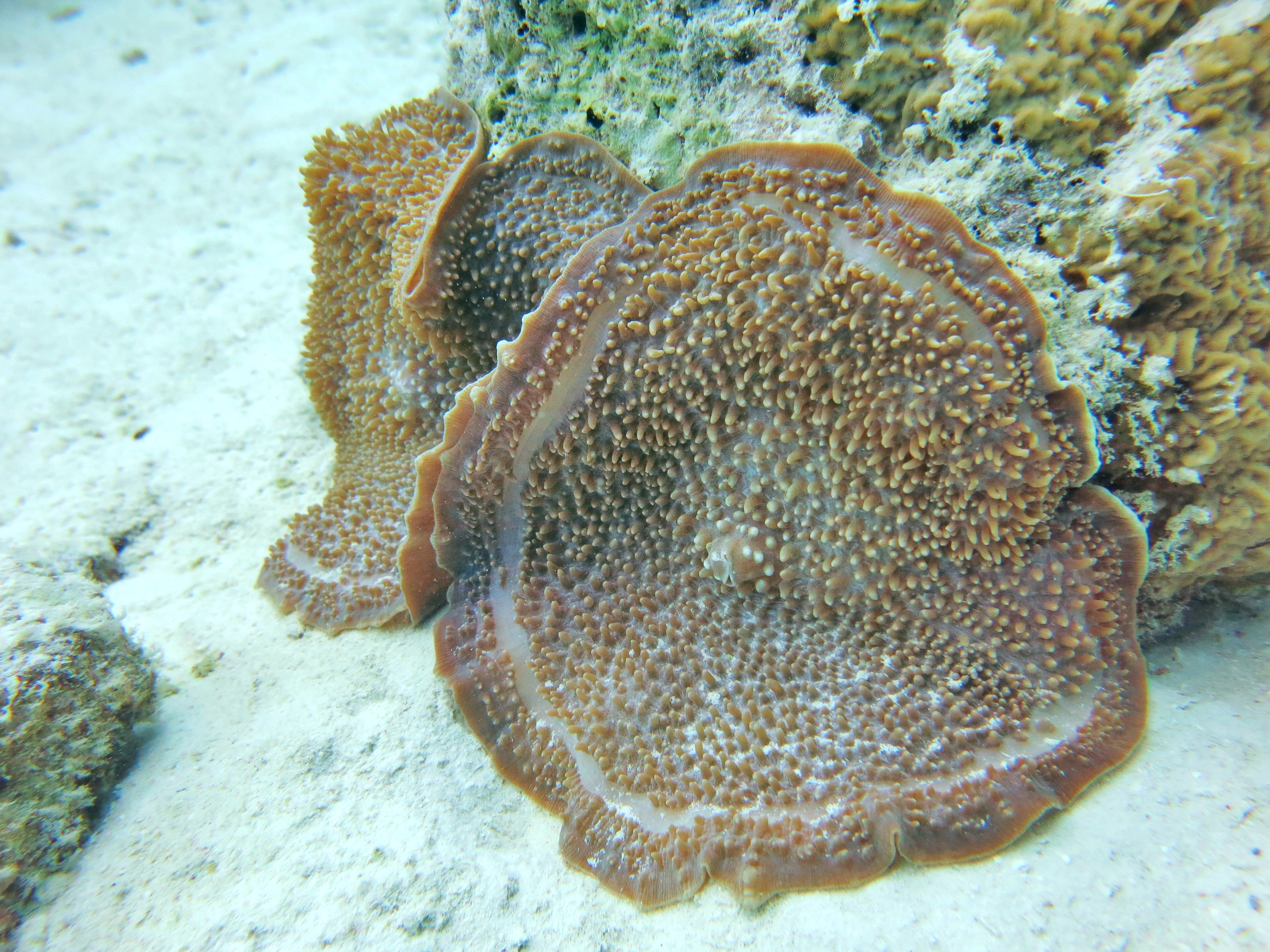
Amplexidiscus fenestrafer

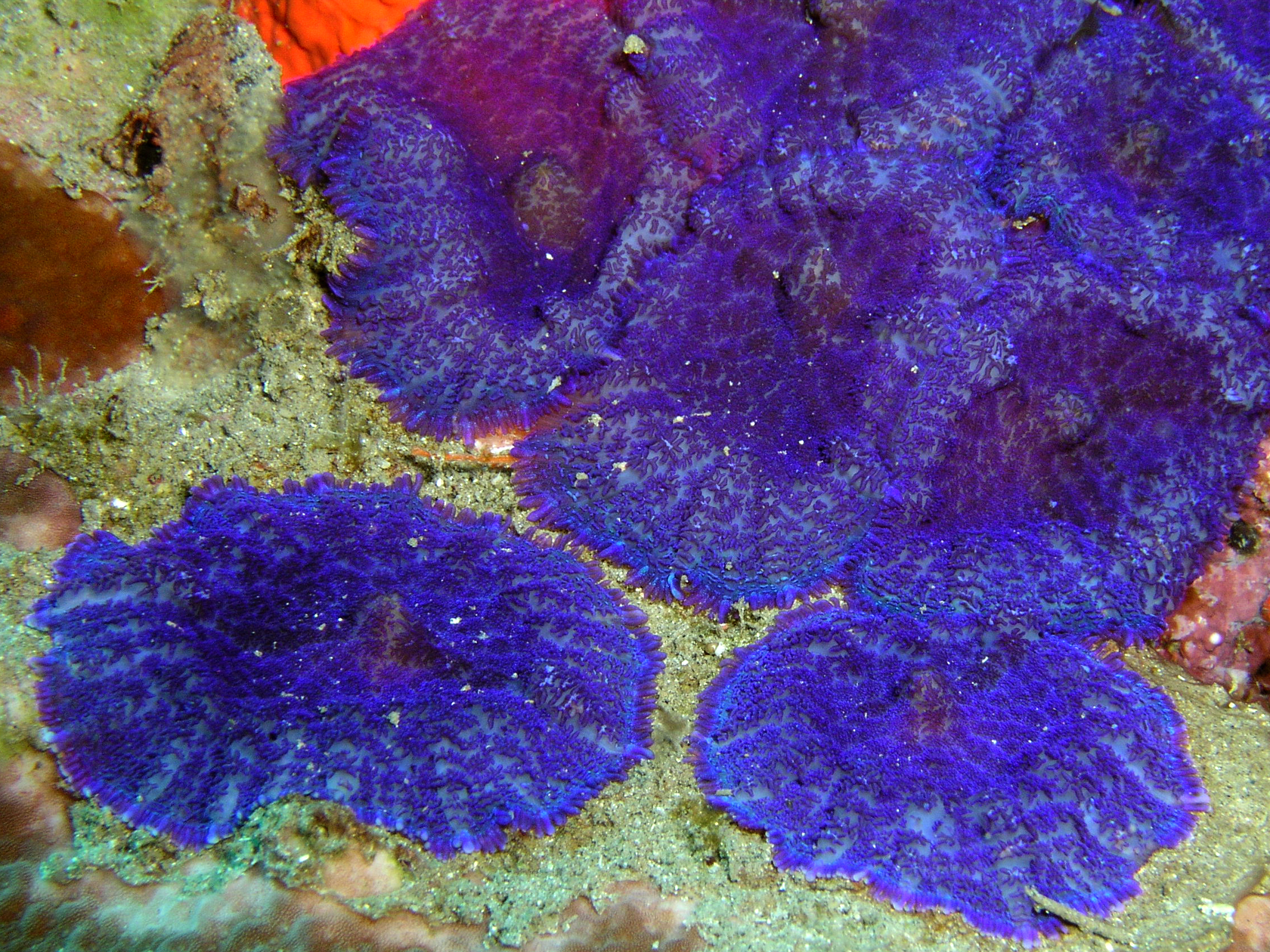
Discosoma sp.

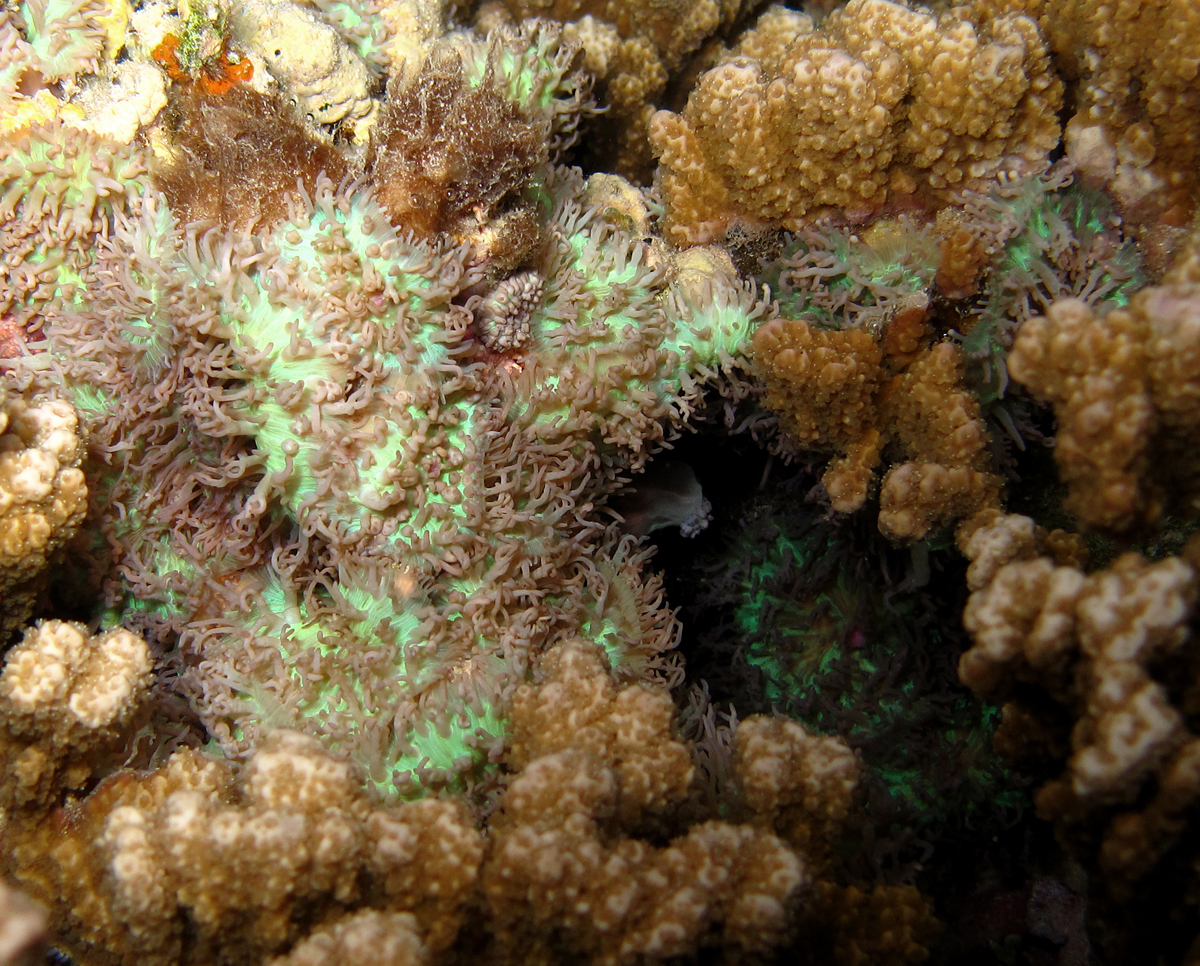
Rhodactis rhodostoma

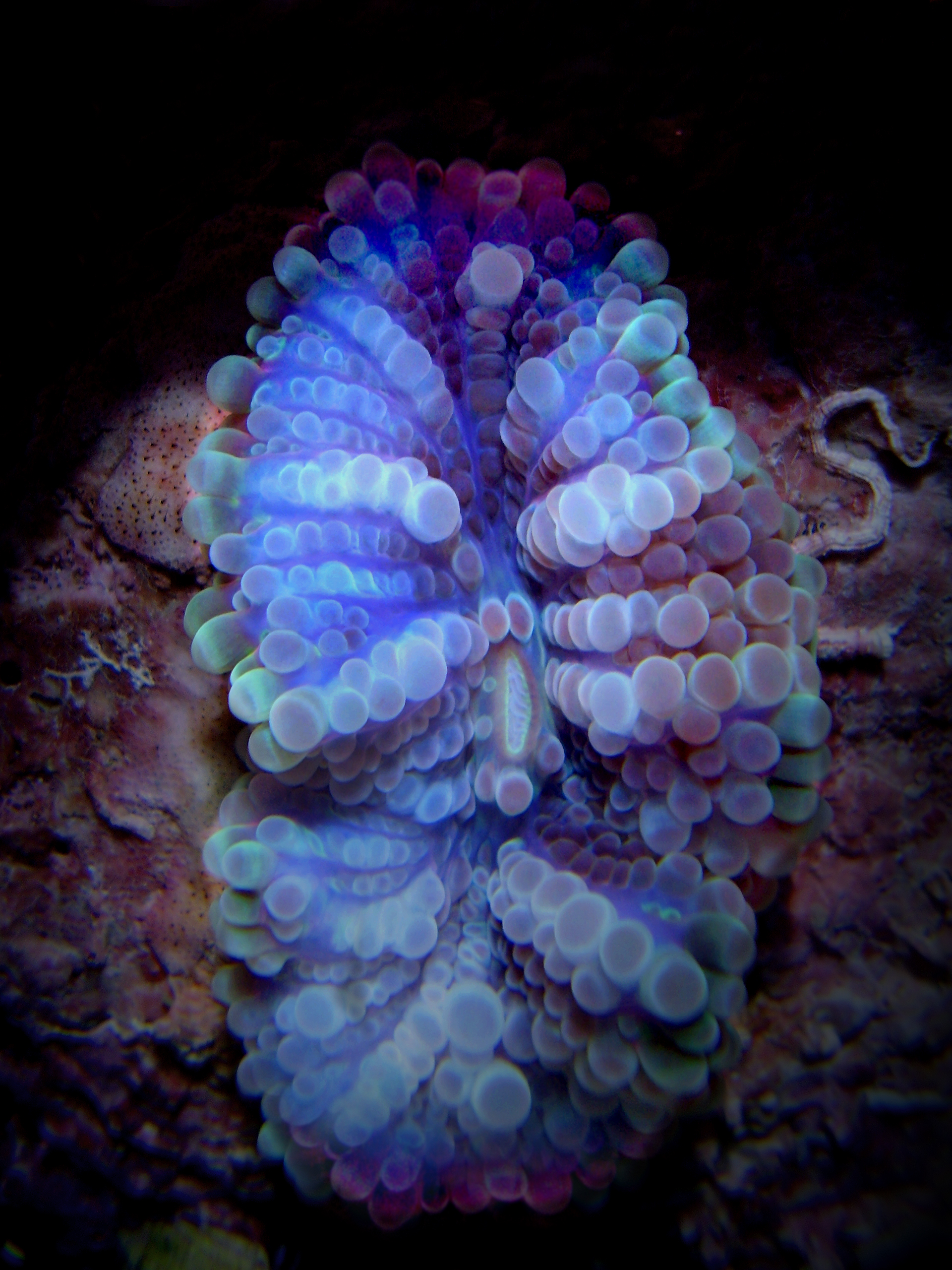
Ricordea yuma
