= Vancouver Aquarium =

Aquarium in Canada

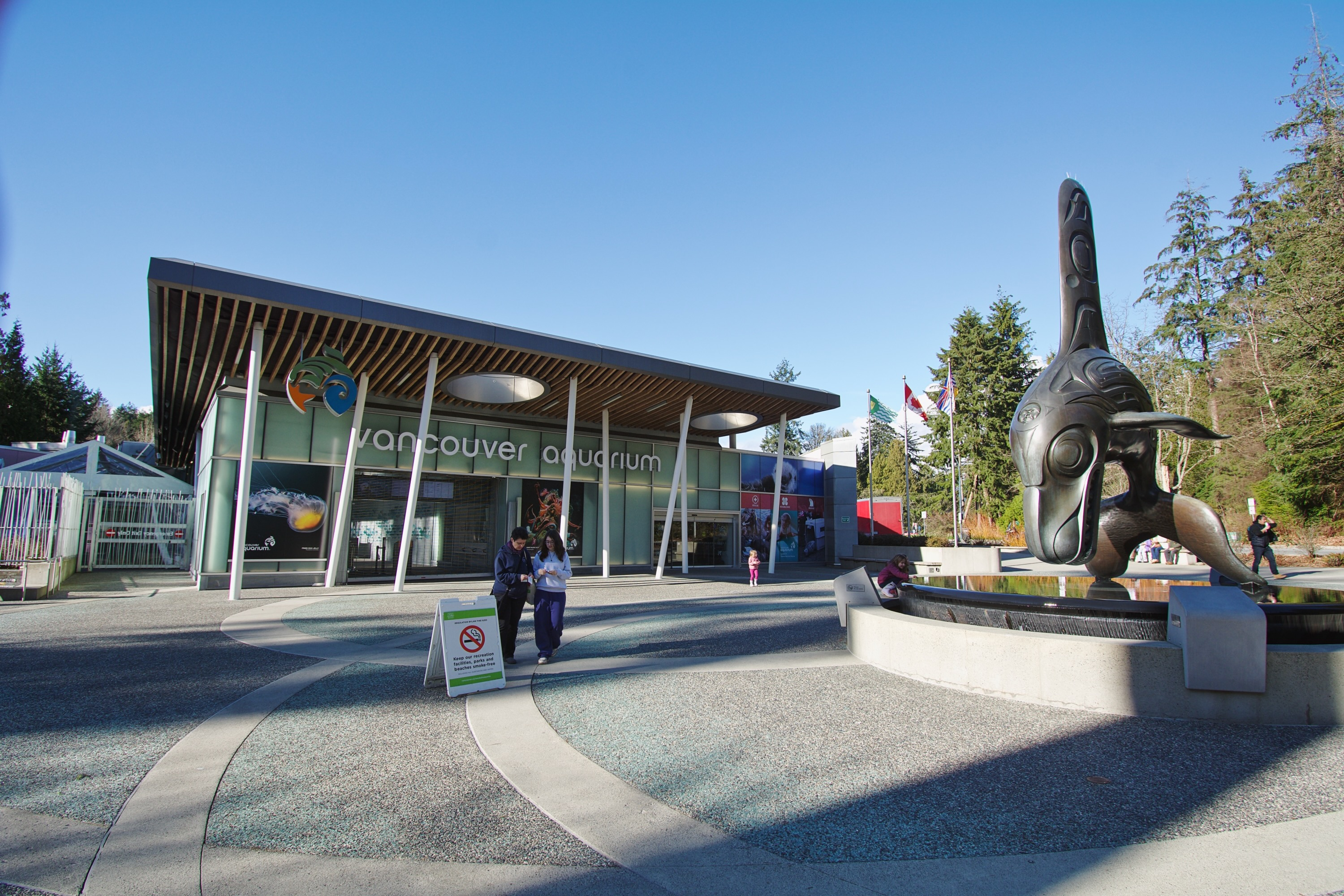
- The Vancouver Aquarium in March 2026
- Interactive map of Vancouver Aquarium
- 49.300586°N 123.131053°W
- Date opened: June 15, 1956
- Location: 845 Avison Way; Vancouver, British Columbia; V6G 3E2
- Land area: 2.1 acres (0.85 ha)
- Floor space: 100,000 square feet (9,300 m^{2})
- No. of animals: 65,000
- Total volume of tanks: 9,500,000 litres (2,100,000 imp gal; 2,500,000 US gal)
- Memberships: AZA, CAZA, WAZA, AMMPA
- Owner: Herschend
- Public transit: 19 Stanley Park
- Website: vanaqua.org

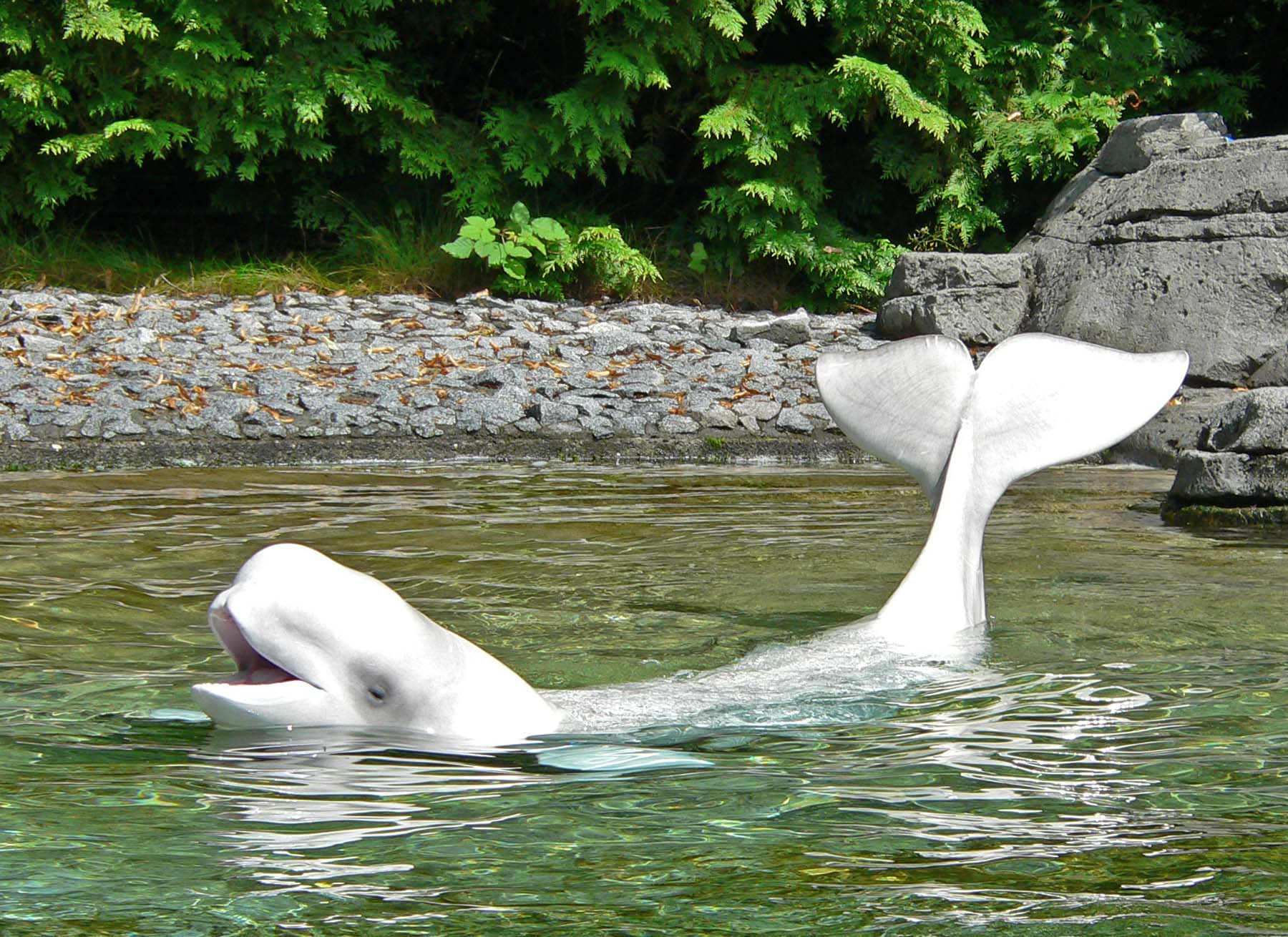
a former Beluga at the Vancouver Aquarium

The Vancouver Aquarium is a public aquarium located in Stanley Park in Vancouver, British Columbia, Canada. In addition to being a major tourist attraction for Vancouver, the aquarium is a centre for marine research, ocean literacy education, climate activism, conservation and marine animal rehabilitation.

The Vancouver Aquarium was one of the first facilities to incorporate professional naturalists into the galleries to interpret animal behaviours. Prior to this, at the London Zoo Fish House, naturalists James S. Bowerbank, Ray Lankester, David W. Mitchell and Philip H. Gosse (the creator of the word aquarium) had regularly held "open house" events, but the Vancouver Aquarium was the first to employ educational naturalists on a full-time basis. Aquarium research projects extend worldwide, and include marine mammal rescue and rehabilitation.

On August 9, 2010, Prime Minister Stephen Harper and B.C. Premier Gordon Campbell announced capital funding of up to $15 million. The province would donate $10 million in funding over the next three years to help pay for a planned expansion of the 54-year-old facility, Premier Gordon Campbell said. Harper added that Ottawa would hand over up to $5 million to the aquarium for infrastructure upgrades. The aquarium, however, remained a nonprofit organization. The property is owned by the City of Vancouver and rented to the aquarium for $40,000 a year since 1991 (prior to which it was $1 per year).

On August 31, 2020, the nonprofit announced on Facebook that due to the financial stresses caused by the ongoing COVID-19 pandemic, it was pausing its public programming for the time being while it engages in strategic planning for the financial sustainability of its future operations. On April 15, 2021, the Aquarium announced that an agreement had been signed to transfer ownership from the Ocean Wise Conservation Association to Herschend Family Entertainment.

== Aquarium history ==
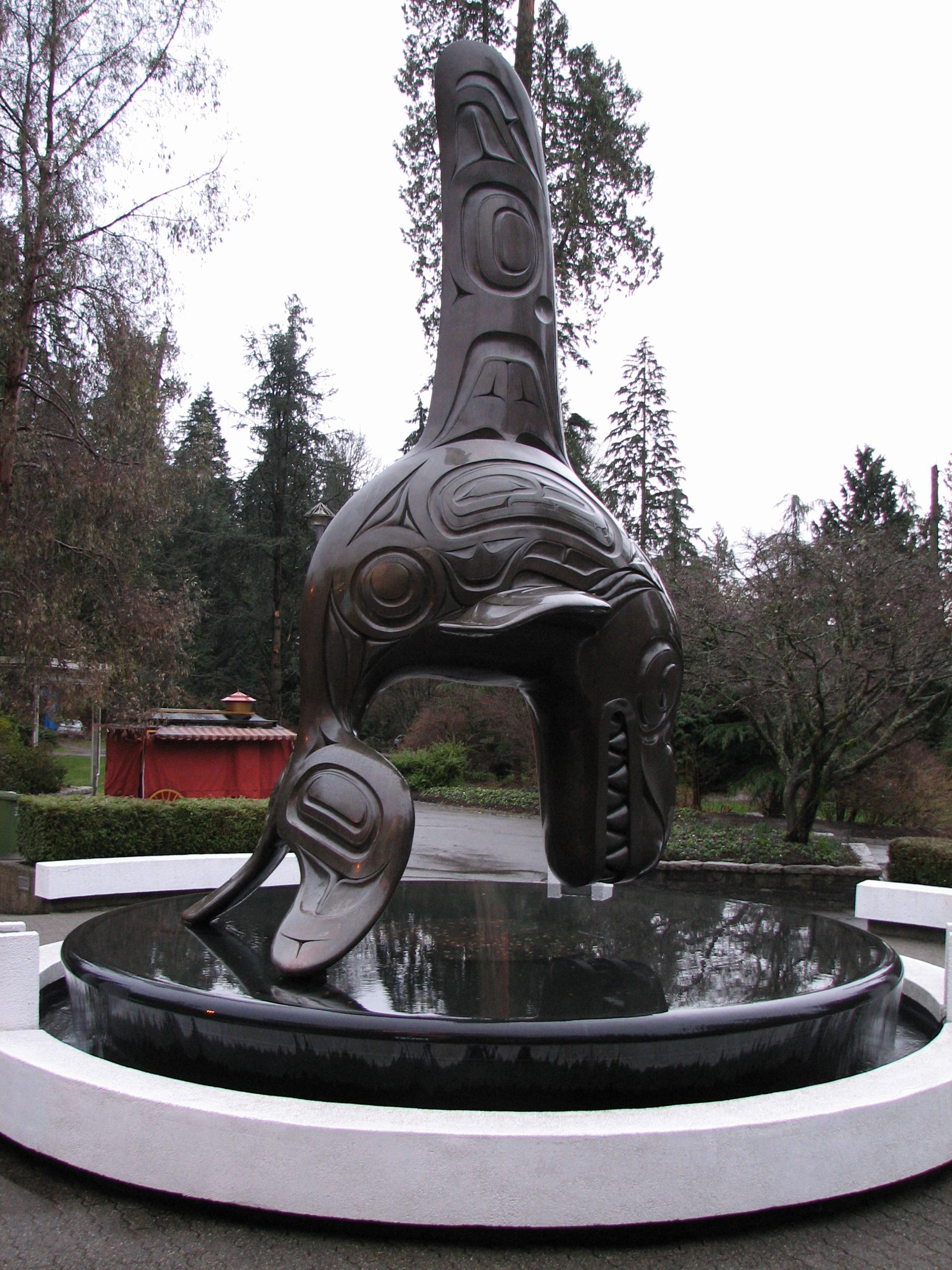
Orca statue, Chief of the Undersea World, in front of the aquarium, designed by Bill Reid

The Vancouver Public Aquarium Association was formed in 1950 by UBC fisheries and oceanography professors Murray Newman, Carl Lietze and Wilbert Clemens. After receiving the help of timber baron H.R. MacMillan, alderman and businessman George Cunningham and $100,000 from each of the three levels of government. (City of Vancouver, Province of British Columbia, Federal Government of Canada), it opened on 15 June, 1956, with the ribbon being cut by federal Minister of Fisheries James Sinclair. Sinclair's 7-year-old daughter Margaret was also present at the ribbon cutting ceremony (she would later marry Canadian Prime Minister Pierre Elliott Trudeau and give birth to Canadian Prime Minister Justin Trudeau). In the mid-1960s, Rufus Gibbs donated $100,000 for an extension to the Vancouver Aquarium (specifically for the creation of the Rufus Gibbs Hall of sport fishes).

Officially Canada's first public aquarium, the Vancouver Aquarium has become the largest in Canada and one of the five largest in North America. The Vancouver Aquarium was the second aquarium in the world to capture and display an orca. Other whales and dolphins on display included belugas, narwhals and dolphins.

In 1975, the Vancouver Aquarium was the first aquarium accredited by the Association of Zoos and Aquariums (AZA). The aquarium is also accredited by the Canadian Association of Zoos and Aquariums (CAZA) and in 1987 was designated Canada's Pacific National Aquarium by the Canadian Federal Government.

On July 23, 1995, a beluga whale named Qila was born. She was the first beluga to be both conceived and born in a Canadian aquarium. A second calf, Tuvaq, was born on July 30, 2002, but died unexpectedly with no previous sign of illness on July 17, 2005.

In 1996, the Vancouver Park Board instituted a municipal bylaw that prevents the Vancouver Aquarium from capturing cetaceans from the wild for display purposes, and only obtain cetaceans from other facilities if they were born in captivity, captured before 1996 or were rescued and deemed un-releasable after this date.

On June 15, 2006, Canada Post issued a 51–cent domestic rate stamp to commemorate the 50th anniversary of the aquarium.

In October 2009 the Vancouver Aquarium was designated as a Coastal America Learning Centre by the US Environmental Protection Agency. As the first Learning Centre in Canada, this designation is intended to strengthen the Canadian/US partnership for protecting and restoring shared ocean resources.

For many years, the primary attraction for visitors was the orca show. The aquarium was the second to capture a killer whale, Moby Doll, who was displayed for a day at Burrard Dry Dock on July 18, 1964. Subsequently, the public was kept away from him, however. Since then, it was home to Skana (at first called Walter), Hyak II, Finna, Bjossa, and three of Bjossa's calves. When Finna died and Bjossa was left without other orca companions, the aquarium attempted to acquire one or more female orcas from other marine parks. However, no suitable companions were found, and Bjossa was moved to SeaWorld, San Diego, in April 2001 where she later died due to a chronic respiratory illness. The aquarium has since moved to emphasize the educational aspects of the displays rather than the public spectacle of the shows. They have also highlighted their research, rescue and rehabilitation efforts.

The aquarium has played a significant role in the research of wild orcas in BC. John Ford, a respected researcher who focuses on orca vocalizations, worked there for many years. The Wild Killer Whale Adoption Program, which funds research was also run out of aquarium (now under Ocean Wise).

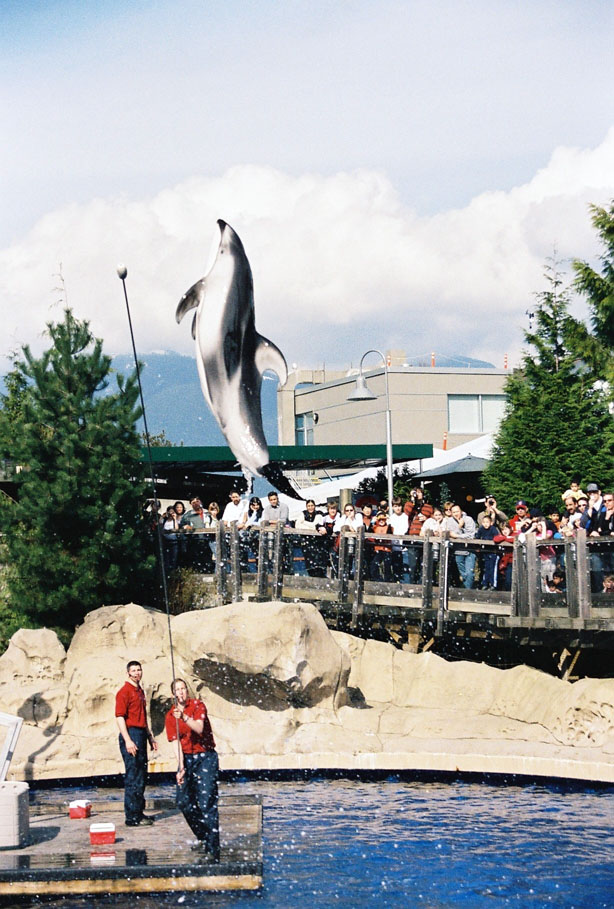
Spinnaker does a high-jump during dolphin show.

After considerable public discussion and some opposition from an animal rights group, the Vancouver Park Board voted in favour of a proposal to expand the aquarium at a cost of $100 million, funded by the aquarium, private donors, and infrastructure grants. A public consultation process, led by the aquarium and their own consultants, showed 89% of local residents were in favour of the expansion. The proposal will increase the size of the aquarium by 1.5 acres (6,100 m^{2}) and extend its lease by 20 years. Construction was expected to begin in the fall of 2007.

Vancouver Aquarium has not kept any orcas in captivity since 2001 and has pledged not to capture wild animals, but to instead rely on captive animals for breeding.

=== Temporary closure and sale ===
On August 31, 2020, the Aquarium made public via a Facebook update that it would be temporarily pausing public programming after September 7. Despite the fact that the summer season was busy upon reopening, the social distancing requirements of being "COVID-safe" did not allow for the necessary visitor volume – ticket sales were down 80% and the not-for-profit was not able to cover costs. The organization stated that it would continue providing uninterrupted care to the resident animals while working on strategic planning; namely, how to operate in a way that would be financially sustainable in light of current conditions.

On April 15, 2021, the Aquarium announced that an agreement had been signed to transfer ownership from Ocean Wise to Herschend Family Entertainment. The aquarium reopened to the public on August 16, 2021.

== Aquarium facility ==
The aquarium covers approximately 9,000 square metres (97,000 sq ft) and has a total 9,500,000 litres (2,100,000 imp gal; 2,500,000 US gal) of water in 166 aquatic displays. There are a number of different galleries, several of which were built at different times throughout the aquarium's history.

=== Pacific Canada Pavilion ===
This central indoor exhibit consists of a 260,000 litres (57,000 imp gal; 69,000 US gal) tank directly adjacent to the entrance. Fish and invertebrates from the Strait of Georgia are displayed in the exhibit.

=== Steller's Bay/Canada's Arctic ===
Originally this gallery included the beluga whales along with several non-living displays. In October 2009, a new exhibit opened here displaying several other arctic species, including fishes and invertebrates, along with expanded non-living exhibits as part of the Canada's Arctic Gallery. In 2016, the two rescued harbour porpoises from the BC Sugar Pool next door, moved to the Canada's Arctic Gallery. Following the deaths of two belugas in 2016, it has been converted into an active Steller sea lion research station called Steller's Bay in collaboration with the University of British Columbia. The exhibit reopened as Steller's Bay on July 1, 2017, while still retaining the Canada's Arctic portion in the underwater gallery. It is home to four female and two male Steller sea lions. In June 2018, a new "Research Outpost" Exhibit opened as an addition to Steller's Bay and programs about the aquarium's research and work regarding walruses, northern fur seals, and Steller sea lions occur.

=== Penguin Point ===
Inspired by Boulders Beach, this exhibit featured African penguins bred by the Species Survival Plan. Penguin Point was demolished in June 2023 to make way for a future habitat following the penguin’s relocation to the West Edmonton Mall in 2023

=== The Wild Coast ===
This is an outdoor gallery that includes several pools, including the Marine Mammal Rescue exhibit in which several pinniped species (harbour seals, Steller's sea lions, and a California sea lion) are rotated in display. Sea otters are also permanently on display here, along with a "surge pool" where visitors are able to touch British Columbian invertebrates.

=== Treasures of the B.C. Coast ===
This gallery is a series of separate exhibits that simulate the various aquatic environments on the BC coast. A giant pacific octopus, rockfish, sea stars, sea urchins, and anemones are among the animals here. In 2021, the Vancouver Aquarium opened the Marine Rescue Exhibit where visitors can meet ambassador animals from the Marine Mammal Rescue Centre.

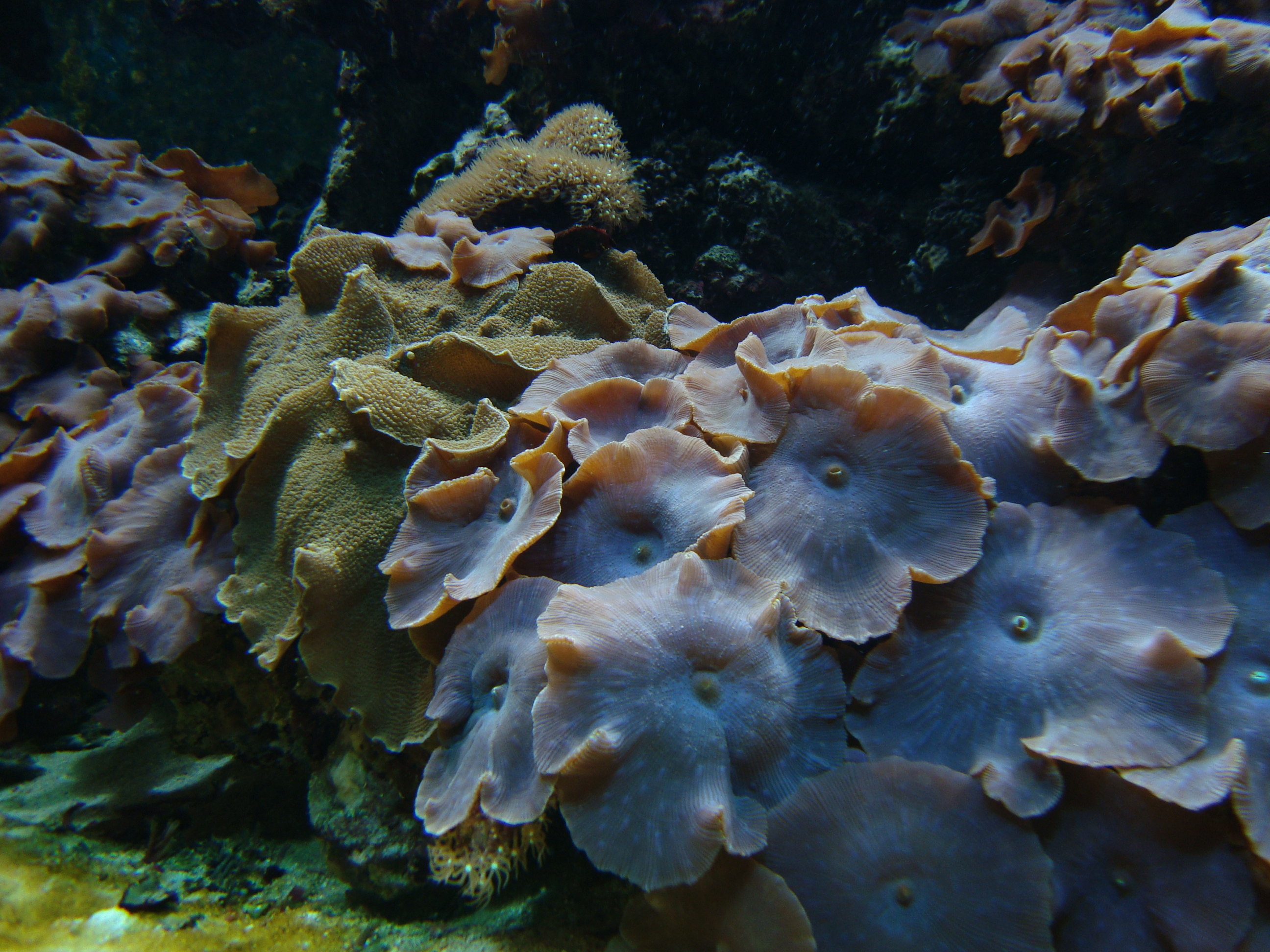
Actinodiscus in an exhibit

=== Tropics Gallery ===
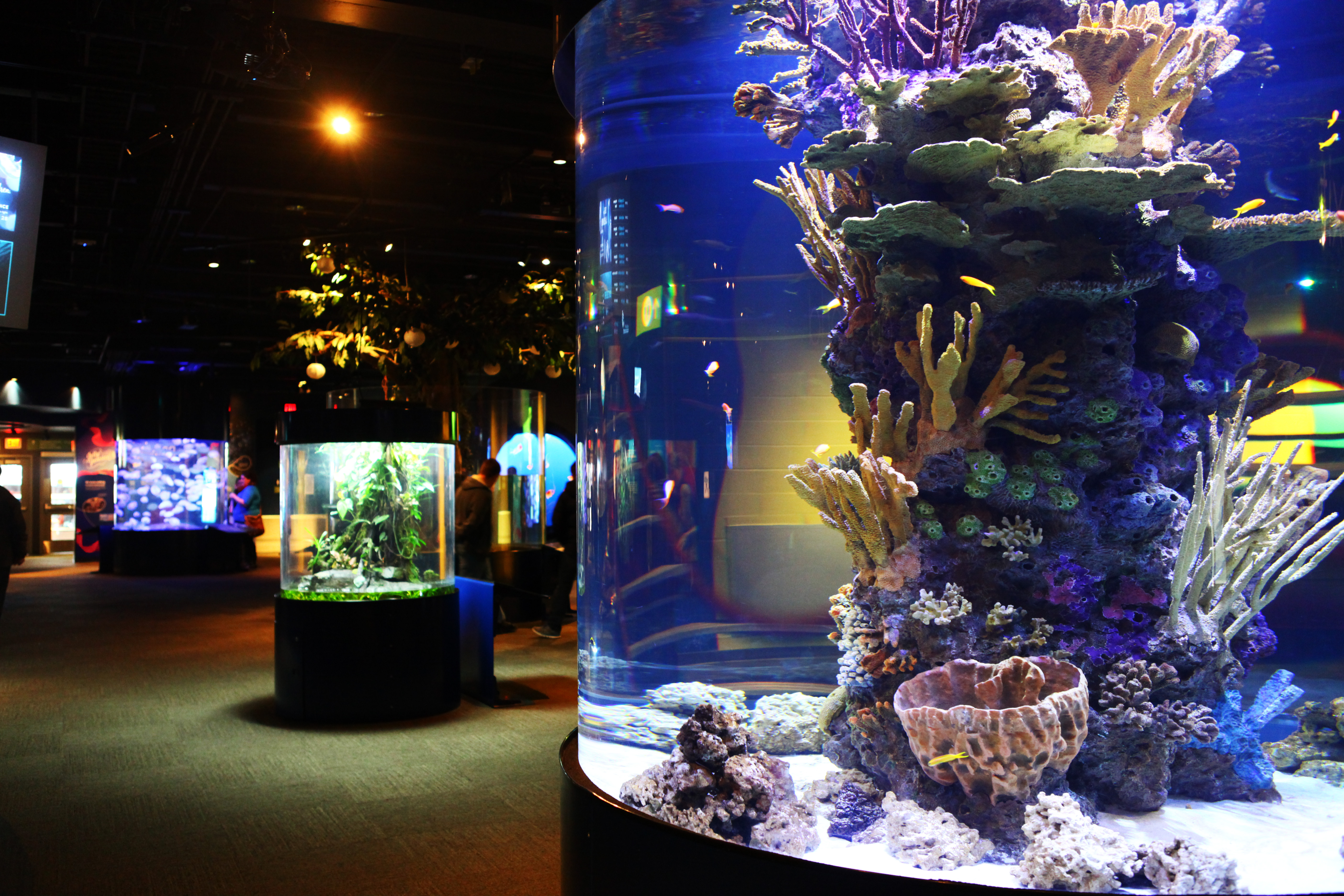
Canaccord Exploration Gallery exhibits

This gallery contains a large display of tropical fish and other animals, including blacktip reef sharks and a green sea turtle named Schoona. Schoona moved to Ripley's Aquarium in Toronto, Canada in January 2023.

=== Amazon Rainforest ===
A number of freshwater fish, snakes, caimans, sloths, birds, and other creatures from the Amazon inhabit this gallery.

=== Frogs Forever? Gallery ===
This gallery is an exhibit focused on the plight of the world's frog population which endeavours to show how people can help protect frogs and other amphibians. It contains 26 species of amphibians from around the world.

=== Canaccord Exploration Gallery ===
This gallery is home to jellies, fish, and other animals. The 4D Theatre and the children's play area known as "Clownfish Cove" are here, along with multiple classrooms for school groups, including the wet lab education room, which contains both conventional teaching methods such as computers, tables, and chairs, along with live animals and various artifacts.

=== Interpreters ===
The Vancouver Aquarium was the first aquarium to host a full time paid staff of interpreters. The Interpreter program began in 1967 and is now widely considered one of the most prestigious teams of its kind in the world.

The Interpreter team delivers animal programs to over 2000 guests every day, 365 days a year. These programs include animal talks about; Sea Lions, Seals, Sea Otters, Jellyfish and a whole range of other fish species present at the Aquarium.

== Animals at the aquarium ==
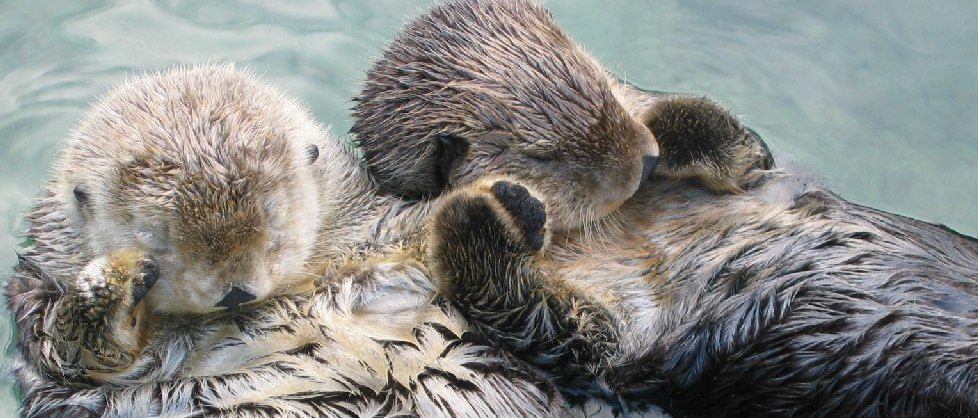
Sea otters at the Vancouver Aquarium

The Vancouver Aquarium currently houses around 300 species of fish, almost 30,000 invertebrates, and 56 species of amphibians and reptiles. They also have around 60 mammals and birds.

Currently, the Aquarium no longer houses cetaceans, including Pacific white-sided dolphins. Previous individuals were:

- Helen, a female Pacific white-sided dolphin, was the last cetacean at the Aquarium. She came to the aquarium from the Enoshima Aquarium in Japan, and is also claimed to have been rescued from entanglement in a fishing net. Helen was part of a multi-year and multi-facility research project focusing on metabolic studies while she was at the Enoshima Aquarium, and is part of a pilot project to understand whale echolocation abilities to prevent whales in the future from becoming entangled in fishing nets. She is distinguishable by the fact that her pectoral flippers are partially amputated due to damage from her entanglement. Helen's tankmate Chester the false killer whale joined her at the Wild Coast on Thursday, June 24, 2015. After Chester's death on November 24, 2017, Helen was the only cetacean left at the Vancouver Aquarium. Helen was transferred to SeaWorld San Antonio in April 2021 to be in a social group with other Pacific white-sided dolphins, where she died on April 7, 2022, at the approximate age of 36.
- Laverne came to Vancouver from SeaWorld San Antonio. She died in 2009 due to a twisted intestine.
- Spinnaker came to Vancouver in 2001 from Japan after getting caught in a fishing net. He died in 2012 due to a prolonged illness.
- Hana came to Vancouver with Helen in 2005 from the Enoshima Aquarium in Japan after getting caught in a fixed fishing net. She died in 2015 from gastrointestinal torsion and sepsis following a last attempt to save her life with a "breakthrough" surgery.

The aquarium used to house a false killer whale:

- Chester was a young false killer whale that was rescued by the Vancouver Aquarium Marine Mammal Rescue Centre on Chesterman Beach on Vancouver Island in July 2014. In May 2015, Chester was deemed non-releasable by Fisheries and Oceans Canada which based their decision "on the animal's age at stranding, his lack of social contact and foraging skills in the wild, and his extensive contact with humans". Chester was at the Wild Coast habitat along with Helen the Pacific white-sided dolphin. On November 24, 2017, Chester died of a bacterial infection. He was approximately three and a half years old.

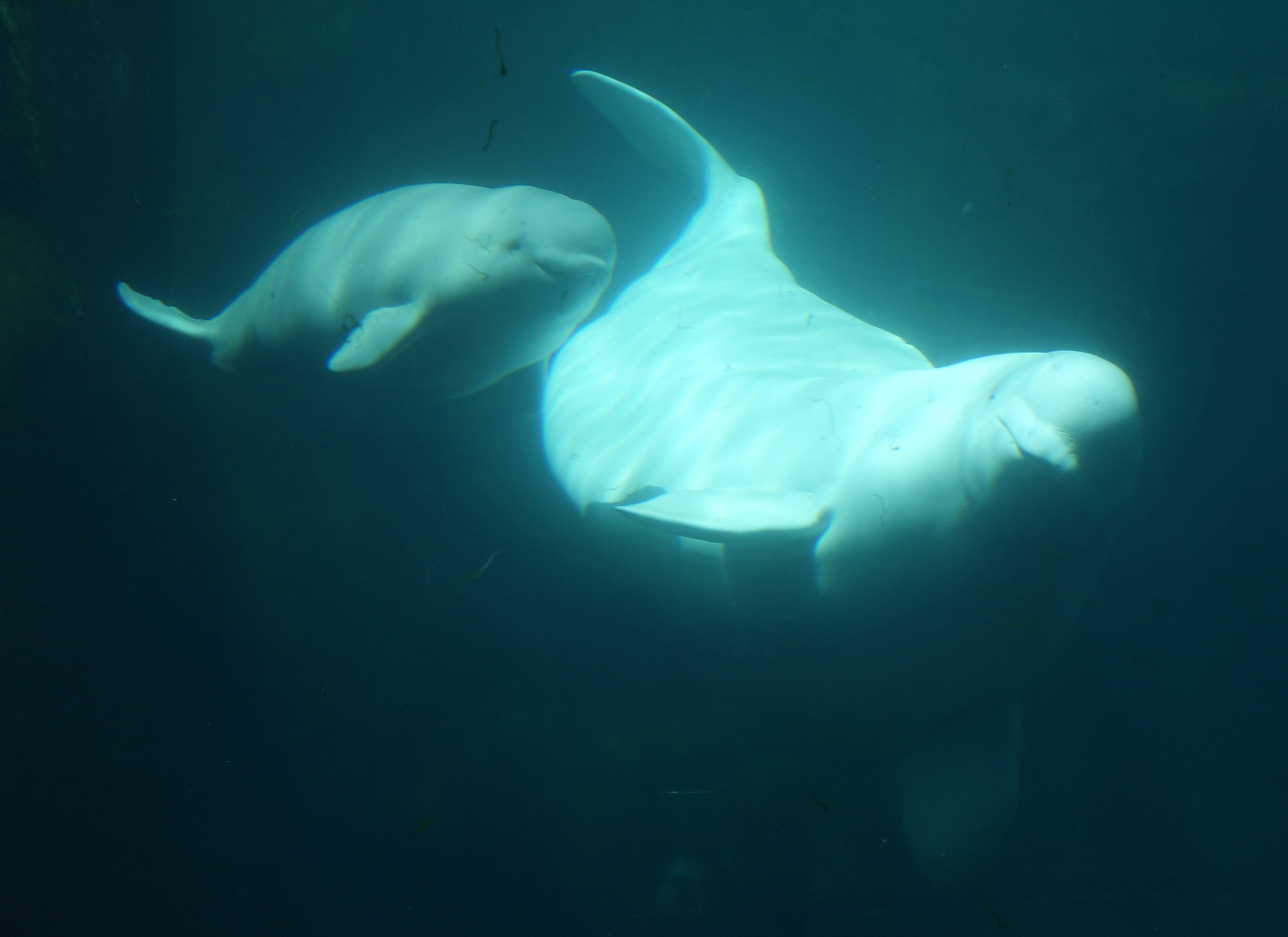
Beluga Aurora and her calf Nala, at approximately four weeks old. Nala died unexpectedly June 21, 2010.

Until 2016, the aquarium also housed two beluga whales. Qila was born in captivity, whereas Aurora was captured from the wild in waters near Churchill, Manitoba in 1990.

- Aurora was a female beluga, who gave birth first to Qila, Tuvaq (who died in 2005) and Nala, who died on June 21 2010 at around 10:15 pm due to coins and foreign matter found in her respiratory tract. "Aurora" is named after the famous northern lights Aurora Borealis. Aurora died on November 25, 2016, at around 30 years of age, and was the last remaining beluga at the aquarium.
- Qila was a female beluga born at the aquarium to mother Aurora and father Nanuq on July 23, 1995 (21 years old). She is the first beluga to be conceived and born in a Canadian aquarium, and is also the first beluga conceived and born in a Canadian aquarium to give birth to a calf. "Qila" derives from the Inuktitut word qilalugaq qualuqtaq, which means "beluga". She gave birth to her first calf Tiqa, who died of heart failure and pneumonia on September 16, 2011. Qila died on November 16, 2016.

Both belugas lived in the Canada's Arctic enclosure (Now Steller's Bay).

On breeding loan to SeaWorld, Shedd Aquarium & Georgia Aquarium are the following:

- Allua, a female beluga is around 24 years of age. She was moved to SeaWorld San Diego on a breeding loan in 2005.
- Imaq, a male beluga who is around 21 years of age. He is on breeding loan to SeaWorld San Antonio. Currently he is at the Georgia Aquarium.
- Grayson, a male beluga who is 8 years old living at the Shedd Aquarium. He was born at SeaWorld San Antonio in 2007, but belongs to the Vancouver Aquarium as he was born to Nanuq, who was owned by the aquarium and also fathered Qila. Until early 2016, Grayson was living at the Georgia Aquarium with his half-sister Qinu.
- Qinu, a female beluga born in 2010 who is 7 years of age living at the Georgia Aquarium. She was also born at SeaWorld San Antonio and lived with Grayson until he was moved to the Shedd Aquarium. As with Grayson, she was born to Nanuq and belongs to the Vancouver Aquarium.

Past belugas:

- Kavna was estimated to be around 46 years of age at the time of her death on August 6, 2012. Cancerous lesions found on her reproductive tract may have contributed to her death. She was distinguishable from the other belugas by the fact that she was the whitest, due to her age.
- Nanuq, was around 31 years of age at the time of his death in 2015. Nanuq was Qila's father and was on breeding loan to SeaWorld since July 1997 when he died of a jaw infection.
- Tuaq was born to Kavna and an unknown wild beluga in 1977 but died 4 months later due to malnutrition and a bacterial infection.
- Tuvaq was born to Aurora and Imaq in 2002 but died unexpectedly in 2005 from a heart arrhythmia. His birth was featured on an episode of That's My Baby.
- Nala was also born to Aurora and Imaq in 2009 but died a year after due to foreign objects found inside her respiratory tract.
- Tiqa was born in 2008 to Qila and Imaq and was the first 3rd generation beluga to be born at the aquarium. Tiqa's name stands for T-Tuesday, I-Imaq, Q-Qila and A-Aurora. She died in 2011 due to pneumonia and heart failure.

The Vancouver Aquarium used to house two Pacific harbour porpoise rescued by the aquarium's Marine Mammal Rescue Centre. Daisy was rescued from Gonzolez Beach, B.C. in 2008, and after receiving almost a year of veterinary care and being deemed nonreleasable, was transferred to the Vancouver Aquarium on July 29, 2009. Daisy died on June 16, 2017. Another Pacific harbour porpoise, Jack, was rescued from Horseshoe Bay, B.C. in September 2011 and transferred to the aquarium on March 15, 2012. Jack died in August 2016.

The aquarium is home to 8 sea otters:

- Katmai is a female sea otter rescued as a pup near Homer, Alaska by the Alaska SeaLife Center on October 17, 2012, when she was only a few weeks old. Shortly thereafter, the Alaska SeaLife Center invited a rotating team of Vancouver Aquarium specialists to help provide intensive 24-hour care and rehabilitation for the pup over the next 17 weeks. After being deemed non-releasable by the US Fisheries and Wildlife Service, she arrived at the Vancouver Aquarium on March 21, 2013. After an online naming contest, on April 2, 2013, the aquarium announced that the pup would be named Katmai after a national park in Alaska.
- Rialto is a male sea otter that was found abandoned as a pup at Rialto Beach in Washington state's Olympic National Park by the Seattle Aquarium. As US Fisheries and Wildlife Services deemed him non-releasable and the Seattle Aquarium did not have space to accommodate another male sea otter, the decision was made to transfer him to the Vancouver Aquarium after he had recovered. Rialto was permanently moved to Vancouver in September 2016.
- Mak is a male sea otter who was transported to the aquarium from Alaska as a pup in November 2016 with Kunik. Both were treated at the Alaska SeaLife Center and deemed non-releasable by the US Fisheries and Wildlife Services. Mak was found stranded in Kachemak Bay, Alaska by a member of the public. His name derives from his rescue site.
- Kunik is a female sea otter who was transferred to the aquarium as a pup with Mak in November 2016 after both were treated at Alaska SeaLife Center and deemed non-releasable by the US Fisheries and Wildlife Services. She found by the US Coast Guard stranded on Homer Spit, Alaska, and her name is an Inuktitut word for a traditional Inuit greeting, or "kiss".
- Hardy is a male sea otter who was rescued as a pup in June 2017 at Port Hardy. He was the only Canadian sea otter at the aquarium until the rescue of Joey in July 2020, and Quatse in March 2021.
- Tazlina is a female sea otter who was rescued as a pup by some fishermen trawling for salmon at Alaska's Anchor Point in April 2019. She was only a day old when she was found by the fishermen, and she got sent to Alaska SeaLife Center by a volunteer. After being taken care of by animal trainers from the Aquarium, she moved to the Aquarium in September 2019.
- Joey is a male sea otter rescued as a pup near Kyuquot, B.C. on July 2, 2020, at about 10 days old. A deceased adult otter nearby was presumed to be the mother. Joey was rescued and transported to the Marine Mammal rescue Centre for treatment. His recovery and care at the centre and the Aquarium was broadcast in a 24-hour live stream. Joey has been deemed non-releasable and will remain at Vancouver Aquarium.
- Quatse is a female sea otter pup who was rescued from Port Hardy in early March 2021. She was estimated to be a few months old when she was found stranded, separated from her mother, leading to her rescue by the Marine Mammal Rescue Centre. After 74 days in care at the centre, she was deemed non-releasable and transferred to the Vancouver Aquarium.

Past otters:

- Tanu was an adult female who was abandoned as a pup, rescued by the Alaska SeaLife Center and later moved to the aquarium.
- Nyac was a female sea otter rescued from the 1989 Exxon Valdez oil spill. She was one of the last surviving sea otters from the incident and was later featured in a viral YouTube video of sea otters "holding hands" recorded by Cynthia Holmes. Nyac died on September 23, 2008, at approximately 20 years of age. Days before her death, she was diagnosed with chronic lymphocytic leukemia, which has been associated with contact with petroleum in other marine species.
- Milo was a male sea otter rescued and brought to the aquarium after being deemed non-releasable. Along with Nyac, he was featured in the viral YouTube video of sea otters "holding hands" by Cynthia Holmes. Milo died on January 12, 2012, at the age of 12 years after being diagnosed with lymphoma. He was the first otter to be treated with chemotherapy as part of a unique chemotherapeutic treatment plan developed by researchers, veterinarians, and pathologists around the world.
- Walter/Wally was found as an injured adult sea otter in Tofino, on the West Coast of Vancouver Island. He had been shot by a shotgun and suffered extensive injuries as a result. After receiving critical care at the Marine Mammal Rescue Centre he became a healthy sea otter who would not survive in the ocean and was therefore moved to the aquarium. He was estimated to be over 10 years old at the time of his rescue. He died on December 9, 2015.
- Elfin was an adult male sea otter who was abandoned as a pup, was rescued by the Alaska SeaLife Center and later moved to the aquarium. Elfin died peacefully on April 1, 2017, at the age of 16. Elfin was distinctively known for his large amount of white fur.

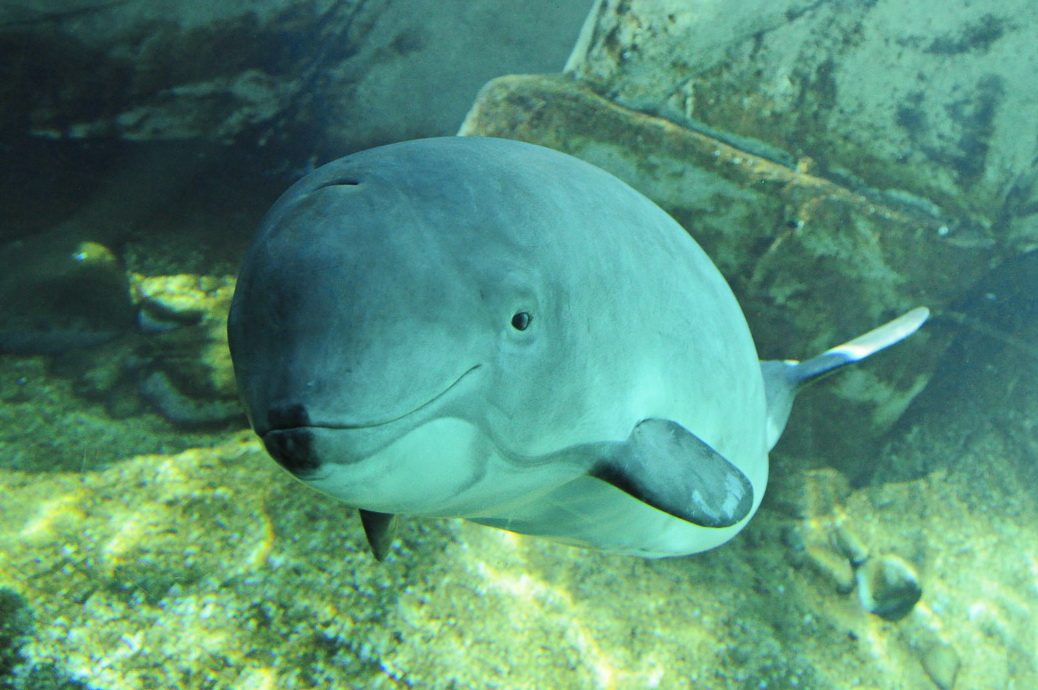
Jack, a harbor porpoise (Phocoena phocoena) at the Vancouver Aquarium.

The aquarium is also home to four harbour seals at this time, 2 females and 2 males (Jessica Seal, Donnelly, DaVinci, and Hermes). Jessica Seal was rescued from Kitsilano Beach in 2019 after being discovered to have been shot in the head by birdshot and blinded as a result. Donnelly was rescued after being hit by a boat in Indian Arm in May 2021. She gave birth to a female pup, Dory, the first seal born at the Marine Mammal Rescue Centre. Donnelly was deemed non-releasable due to her injuries which included blindness, and was transferred to the aquarium in October 2021. Dory was released into the wild on October 17, 2021.

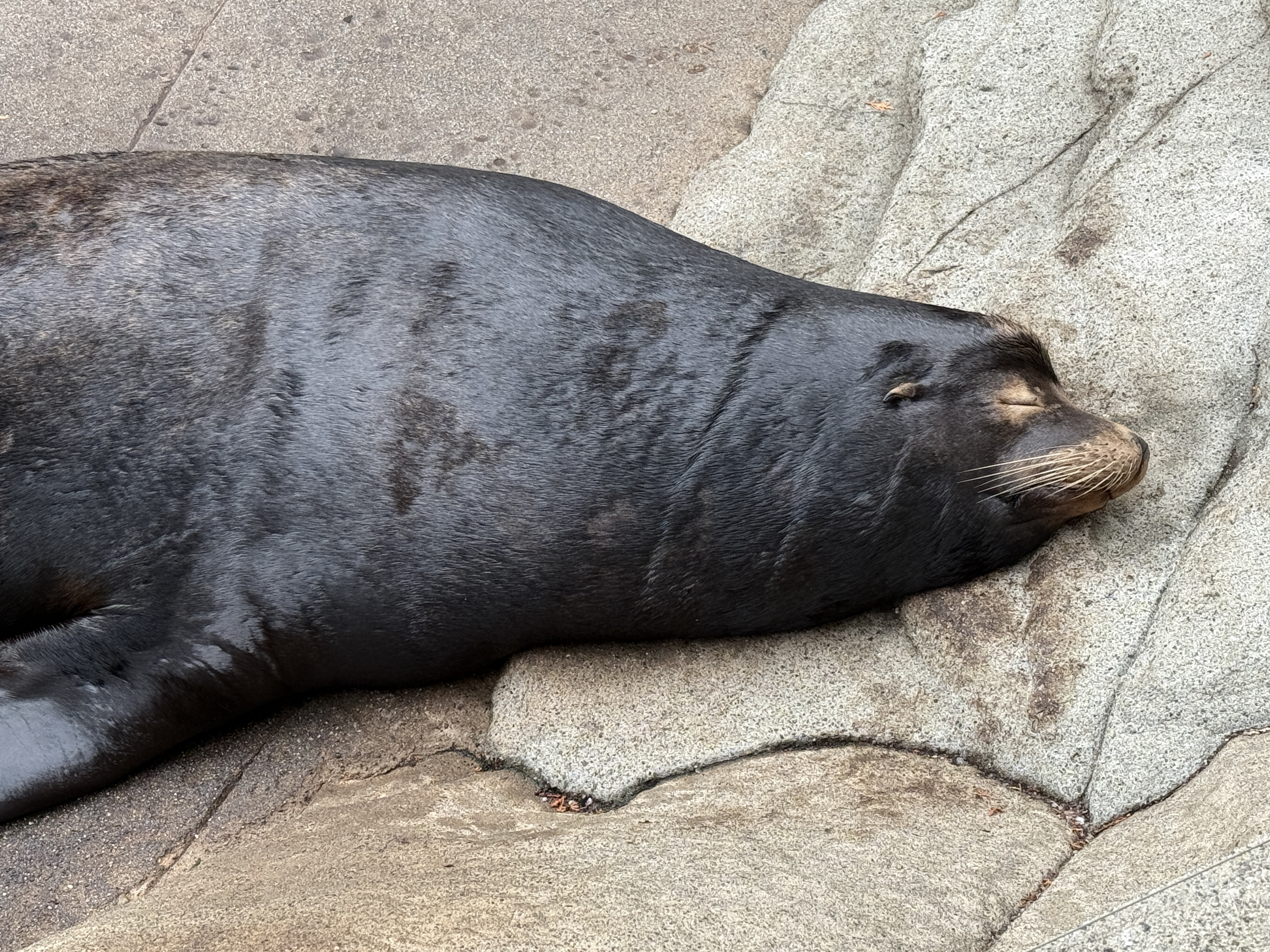
Señor Cinco, a male California sea lion

The aquarium also houses 6 northern fur seals (Meechi, Tikva, Tuku, Kyoo, Aya, and Ani), and eleven Steller sea lions (Amak, Kenai, Willo, Ashby, Rogue, Bella Bella, Izzy, Hazy, Sitka, Boni, and Yasha). Some of the sea lions actually belong to the University of British Columbia, and are part of a research program aimed at studying the causes for the collapse of the Steller sea lion population in Alaska, while Bella Bella is housed at the aquarium after being rescued as a pup on McInnes Island in June 2017 and being deemed non-releasable. Amak and Kenai are half-siblings who were both born at Ocean Park Hong Kong in 2010 and lived at a Japanese facility before being transferred to the Vancouver Aquarium in May 2017. Hazy, Sitka, Boni, and Yasha were previously housed at the Aquarium's off-site research facility until its closure.

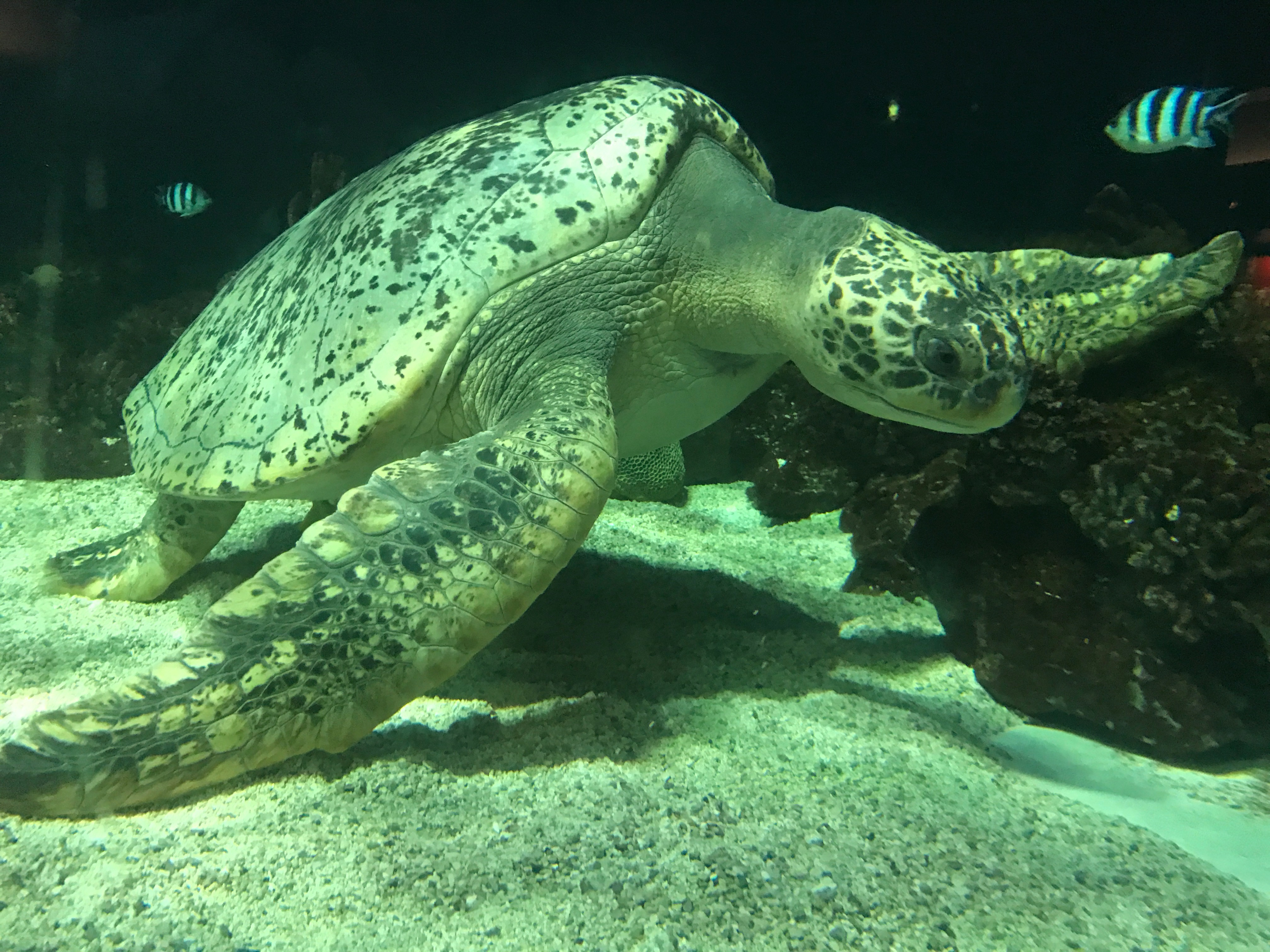
Schoona (green sea turtle) in 2016

The aquarium also currently houses an adult male California sea lion (Señor Cinco) who was found with gunshot wounds on Vancouver's Spanish Banks on May 5, 2017, and blinded as a result. He is their first California sea lion on display and currently lives in the BC Sugar Pool habitat.

On July 1, 2008, Tag, a 15-year-old male sea lion, died due to oral cancer, despite receiving laser surgery and chemotherapy. Tag was a 15-year-old male sea lion who arrived at the aquarium as a 2-week-old pup.

The aquarium has one green sea turtle (Schoona). Schoona is a 16-year-old sea turtle, who arrived at the aquarium in 2005. In 2023 she was moved to Ripley's Aquarium in Toronto, Ontario.

Giselle is a zebra shark who arrived at the Vancouver Aquarium around 2008. Giselle is around 15 years old and has since been relocated.

== Mammals at the aquarium ==
Species	Status	Population worldwide	Population at the aquarium
Sea otters	Endangered	106,000	8
Steller sea lion	Near threatened	52,000	11
California sea lion	Least concern	337,000	1
Harbor seal	Least concern	315,000	4
Goeldi's monkey	Vulnerable	Unknown	7
Northern fur seal	Vulnerable	650,000	6
Linnaeus's two-toed sloth	Least concern	Unknown	2

== Vancouver Aquarium Amazon Gallery ==
Species	Status	Population worldwide
Red-footed tortoise	Vulnerable	Unknown
Mata mata	Least concern	Unknown
Yacare caiman	Least concern	Unknown
Goeldi's monkey	Vulnerable	Unknown
Green anaconda	No data	Unknown
Emerald tree boa	Least concern	Unknown
Linnaeus's two-toed sloth	Least concern	Unknown
Ringed teal	Least concern	6,700 - 67,000
Scarlet ibis	Least concern	100,000 - 150,000

Vancouver Aquarium Amazon Gallery

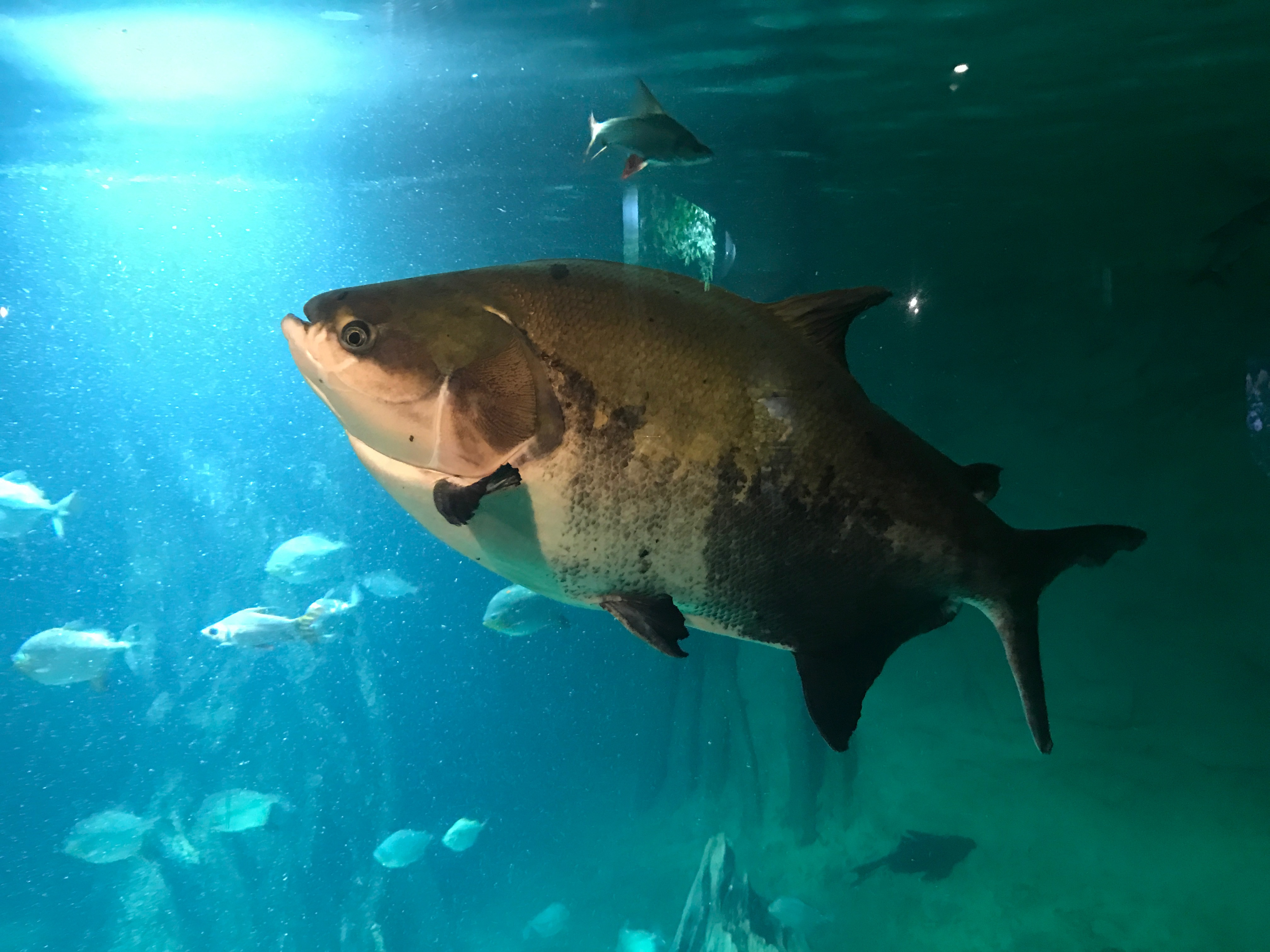
Tambaqui

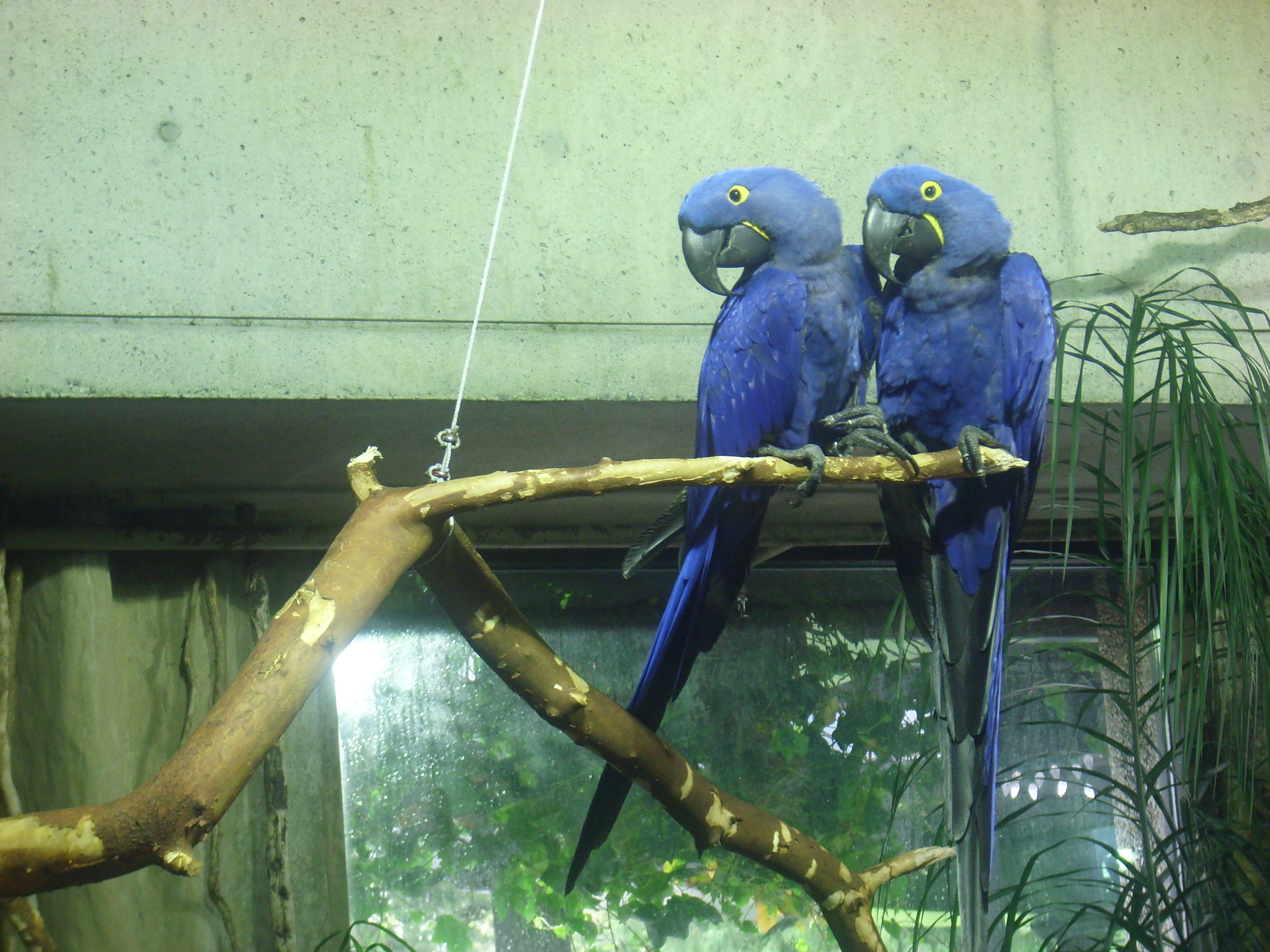
Hyacinth macaws

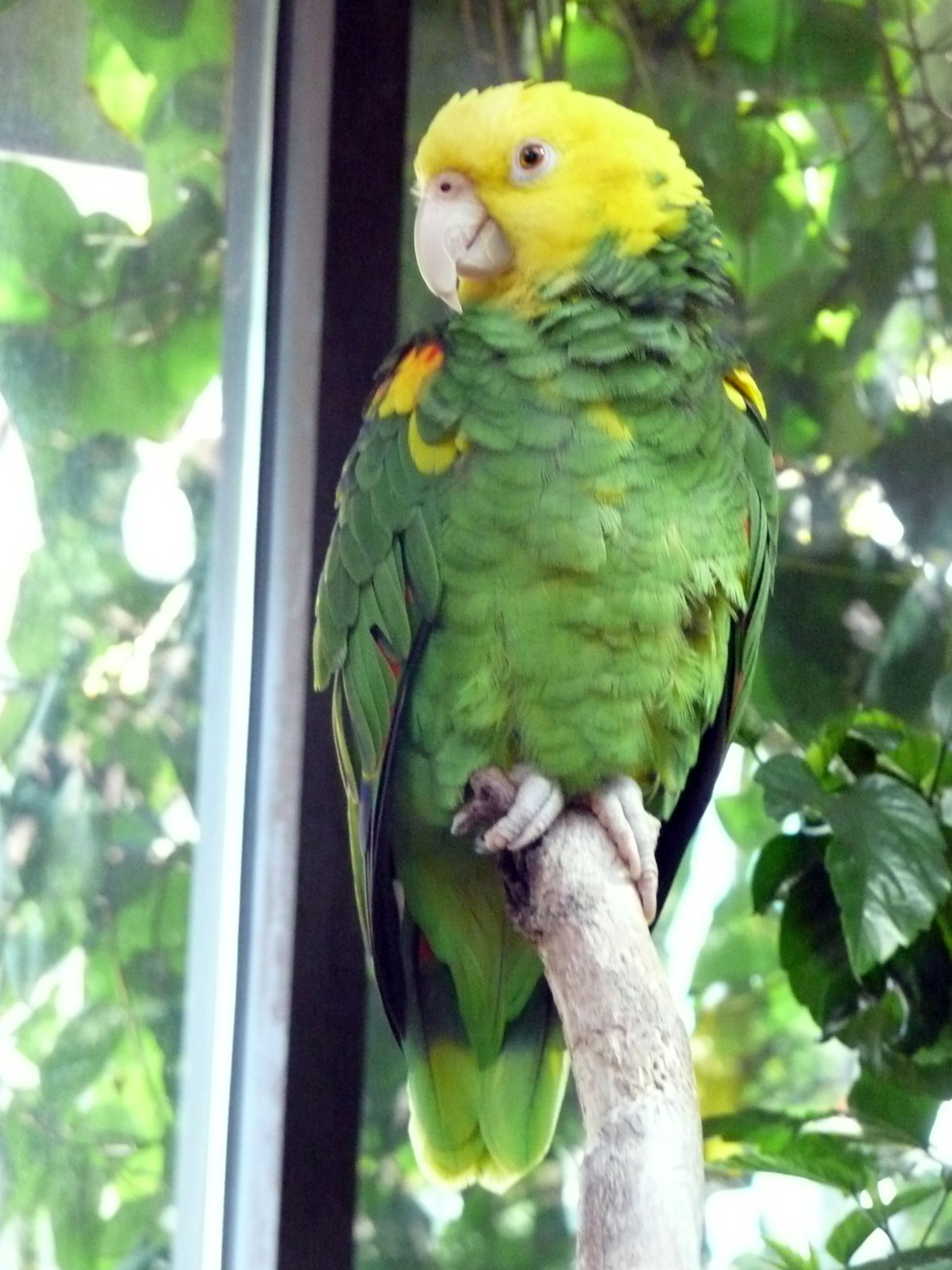
Yellow-headed amazon

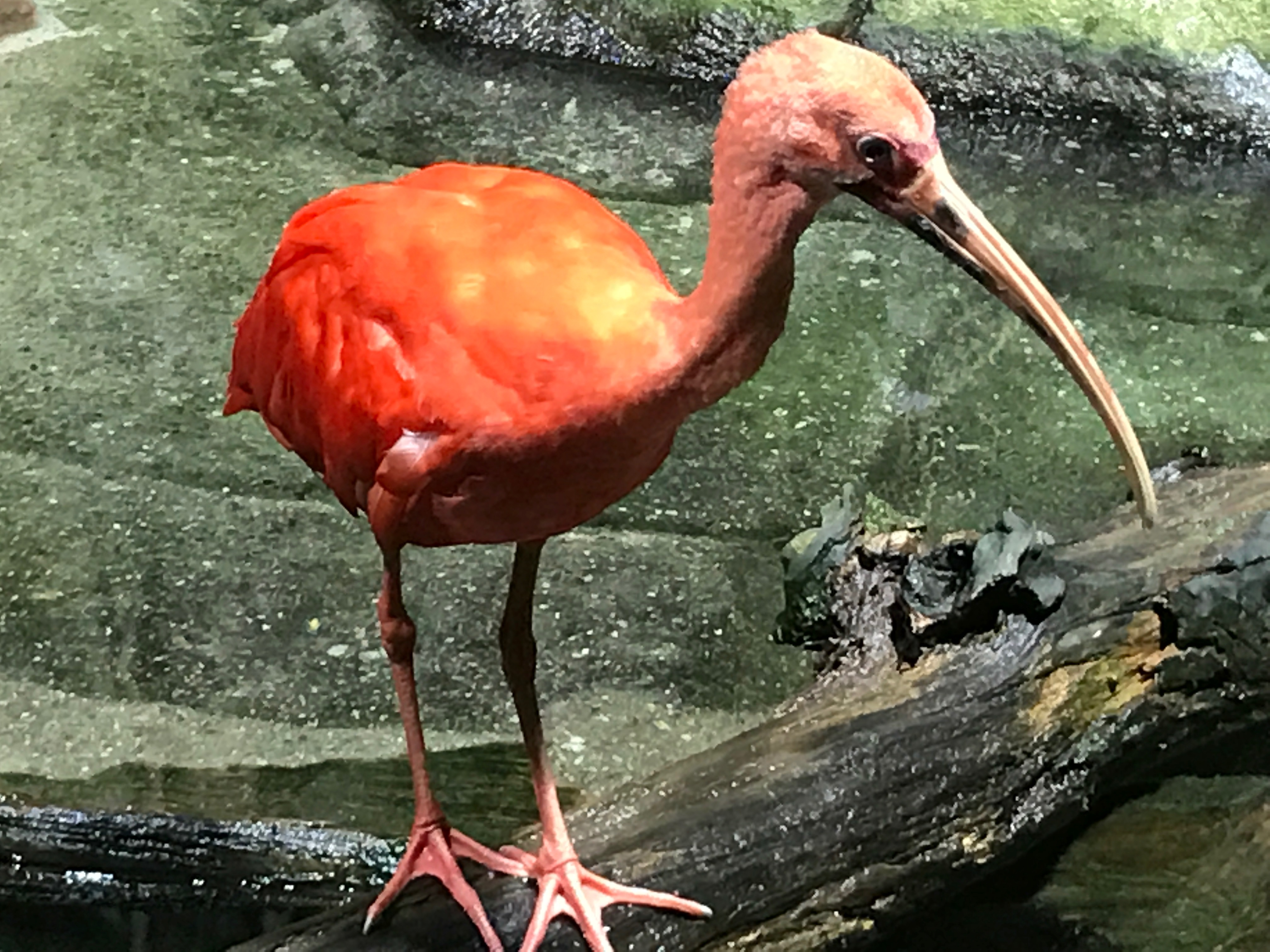
Scarlet ibis

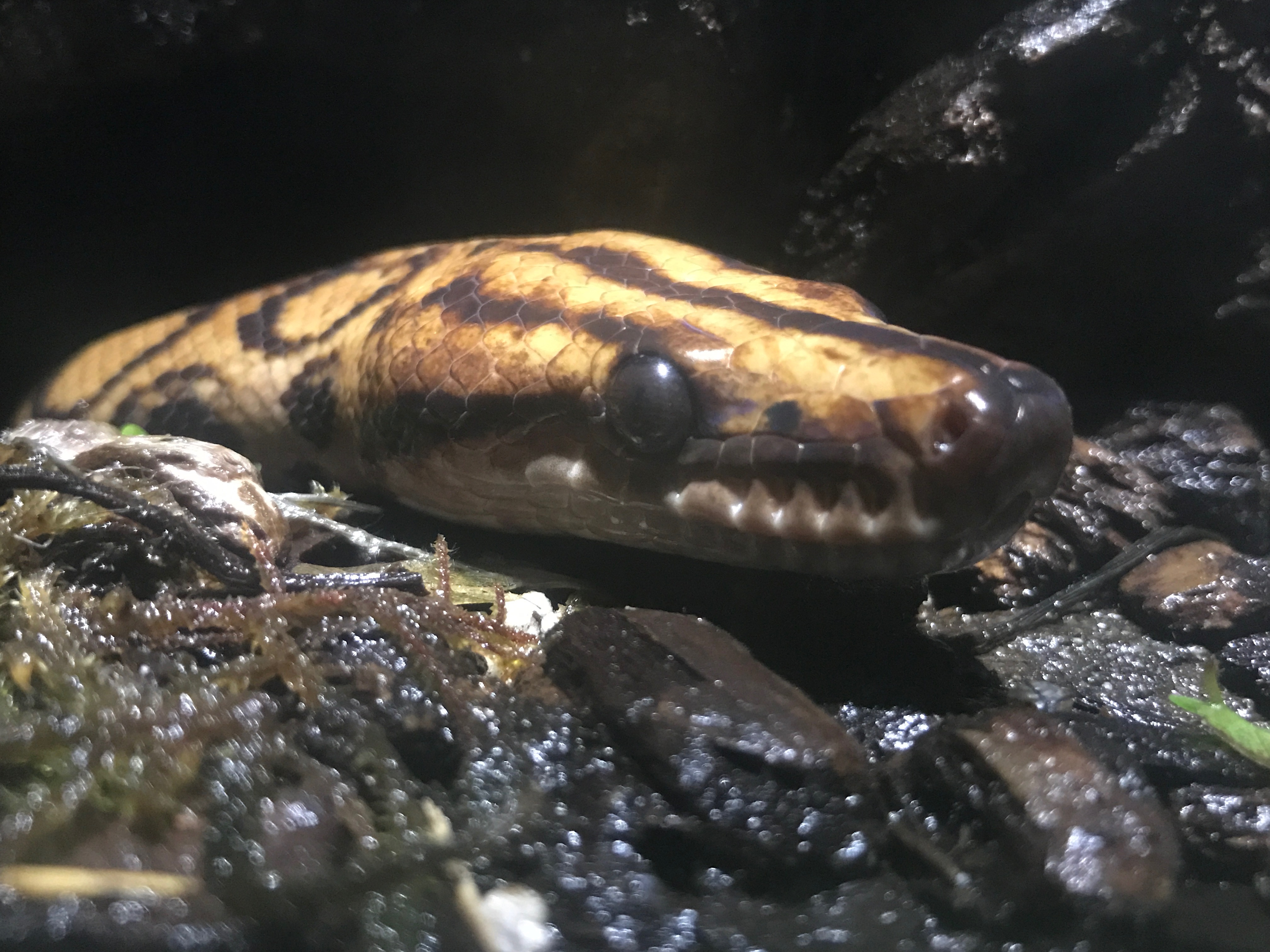
Brazilian rainbow boa

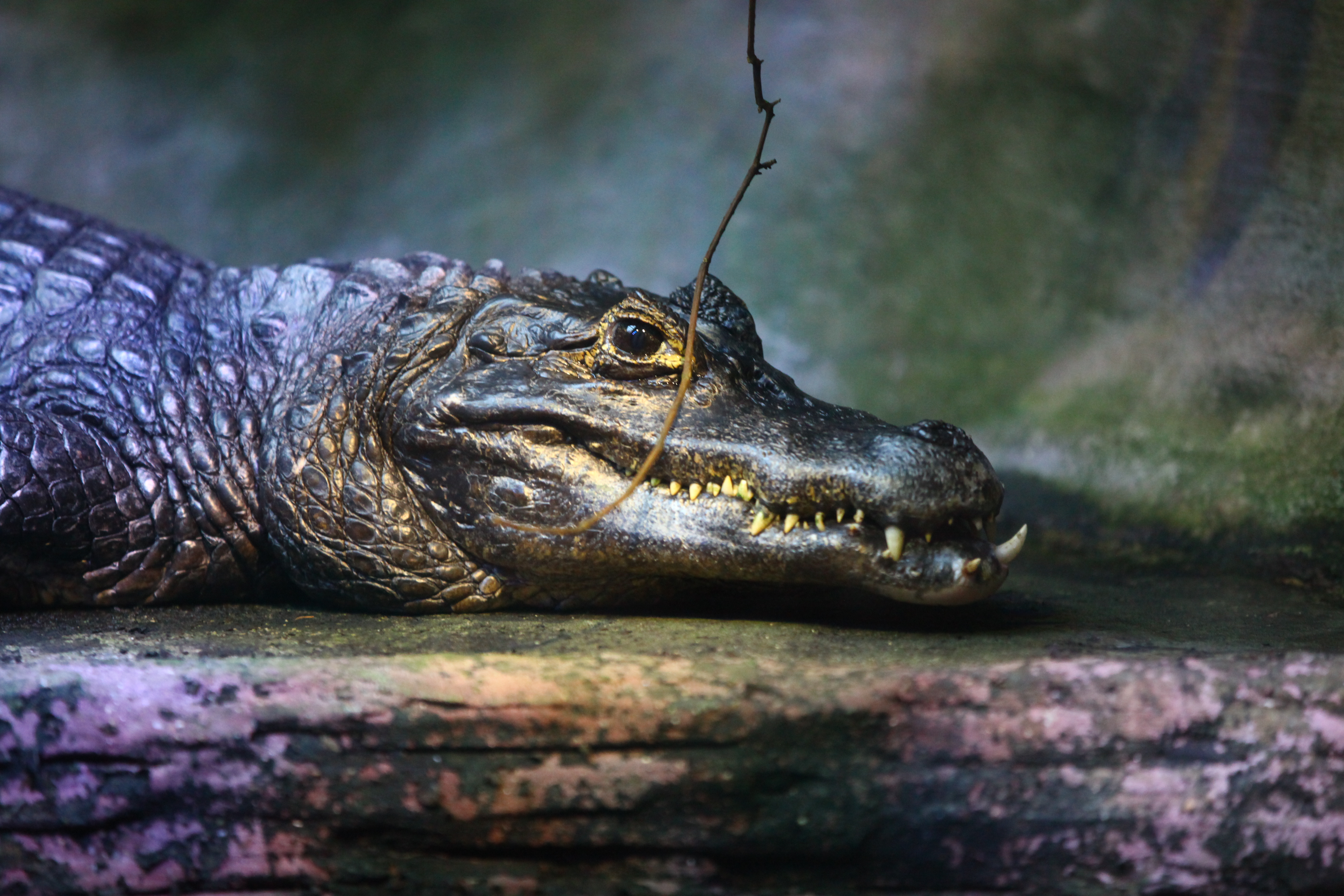
Yacare caiman

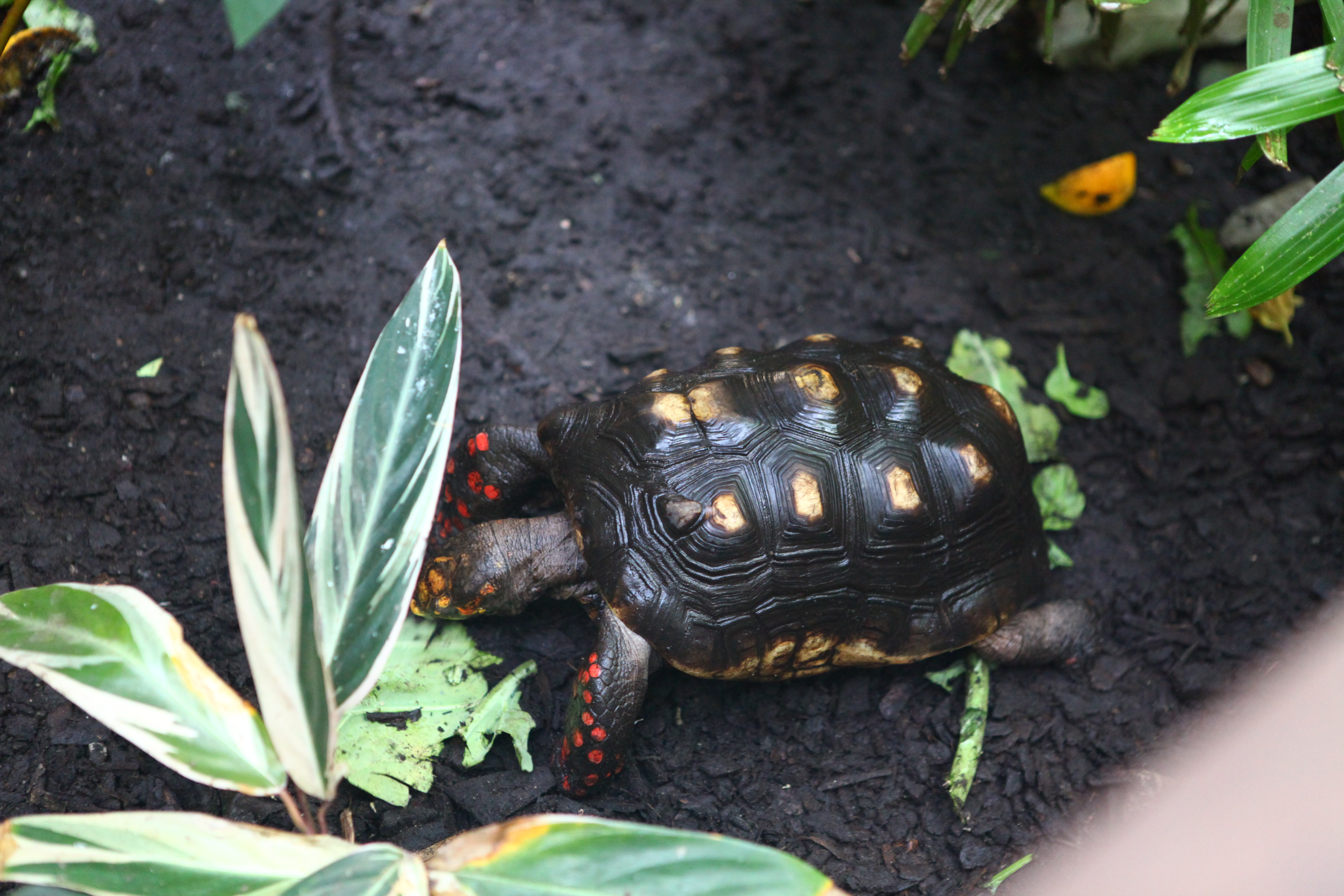
Red-footed tortoise

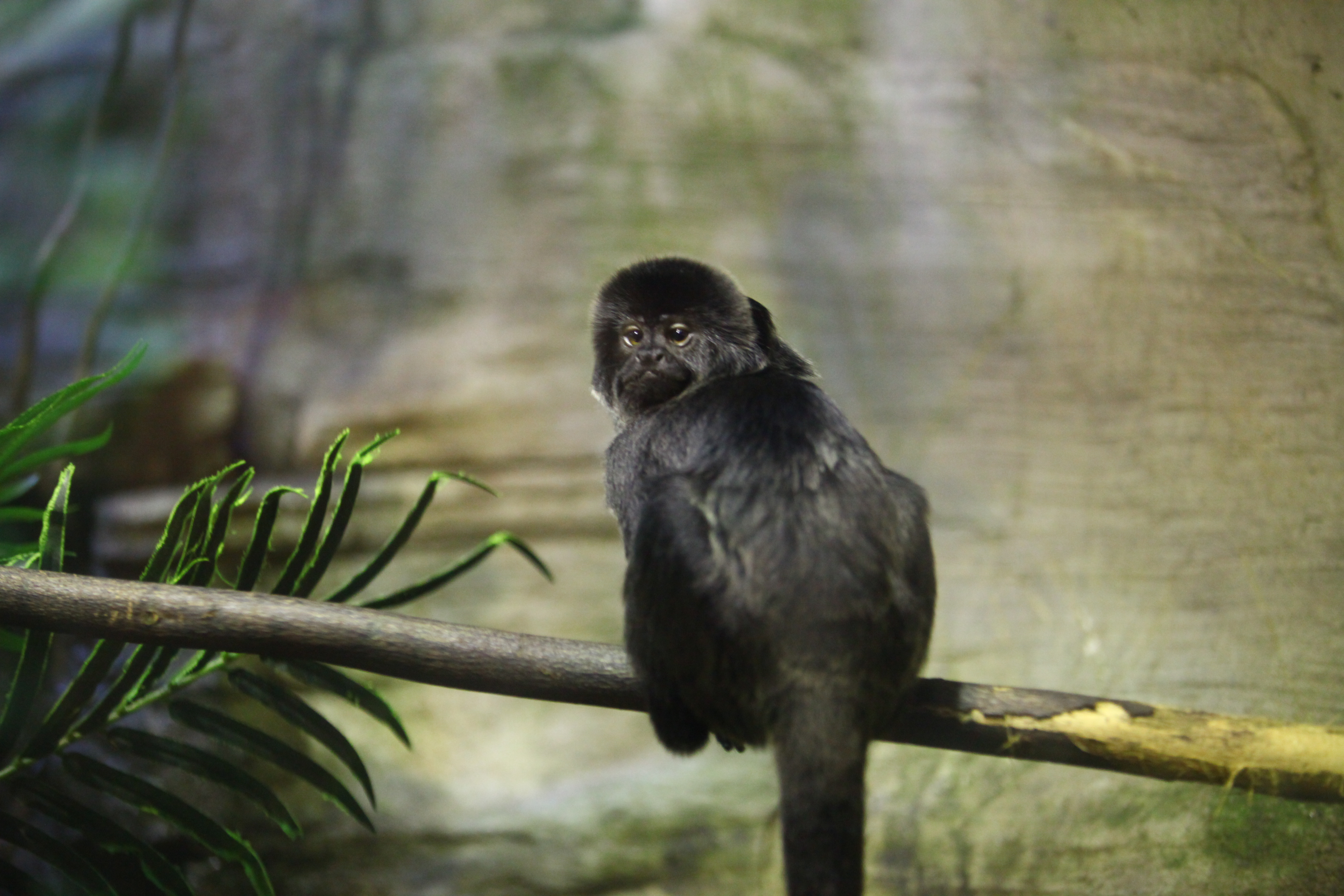
Goeldi's monkey

== Frogs Forever? ==
Species	Status	Population worldwide
Axolotl	Critically endangered	1,200
Blue poison dart frog	Not evaluated	Unknown
Oregon spotted frog	Vulnerable	Unknown
Golden poison frog	Endangered	Unknown
Panamanian golden frog	Critically Endangered	Possibly extinct in the wild
False tomato frog	Least concern	Unknown
Rio Cauca caecillian	Least concern	Unknown

Frogs Forever?

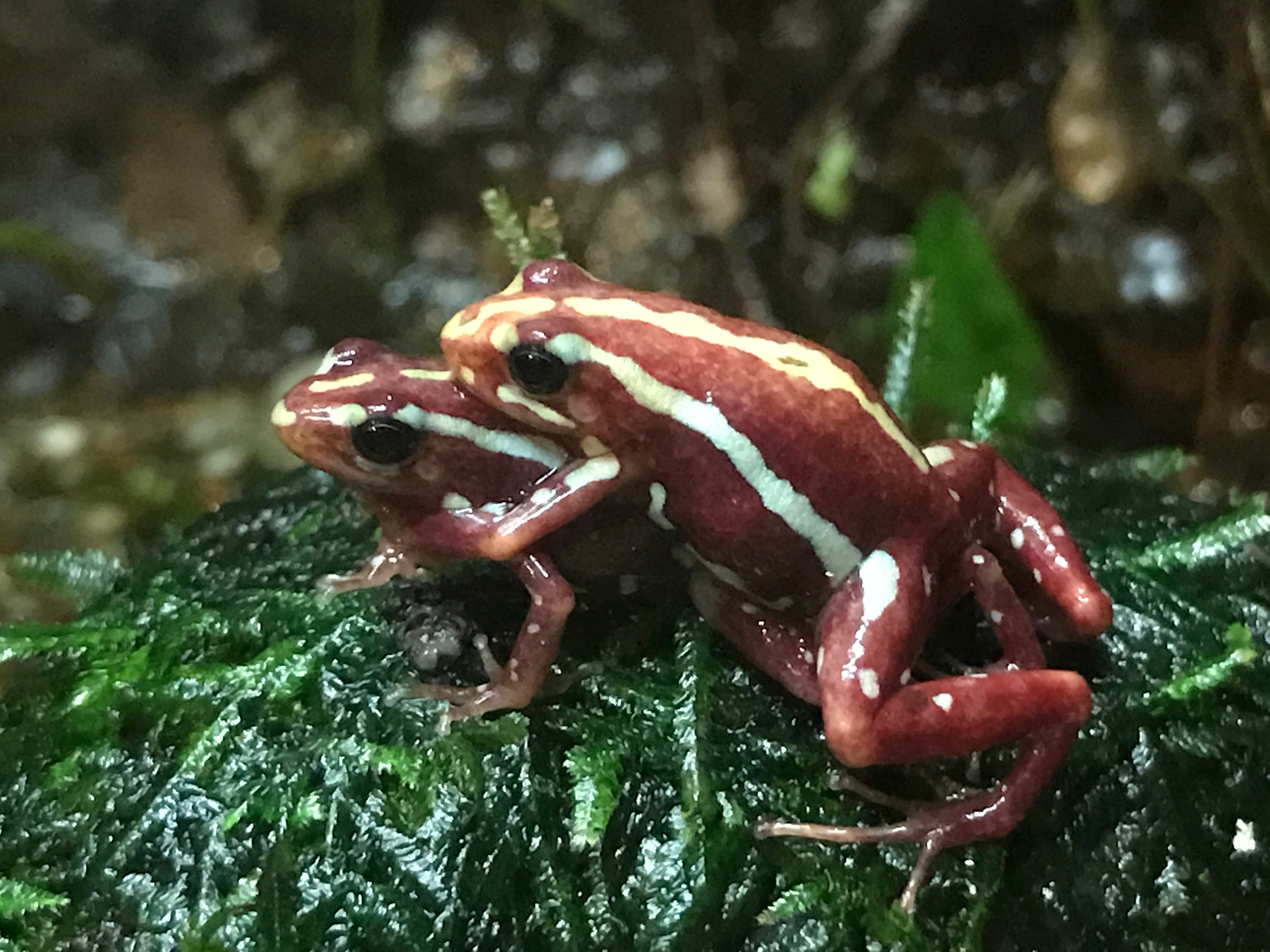
Phantasmal poison frogs mating

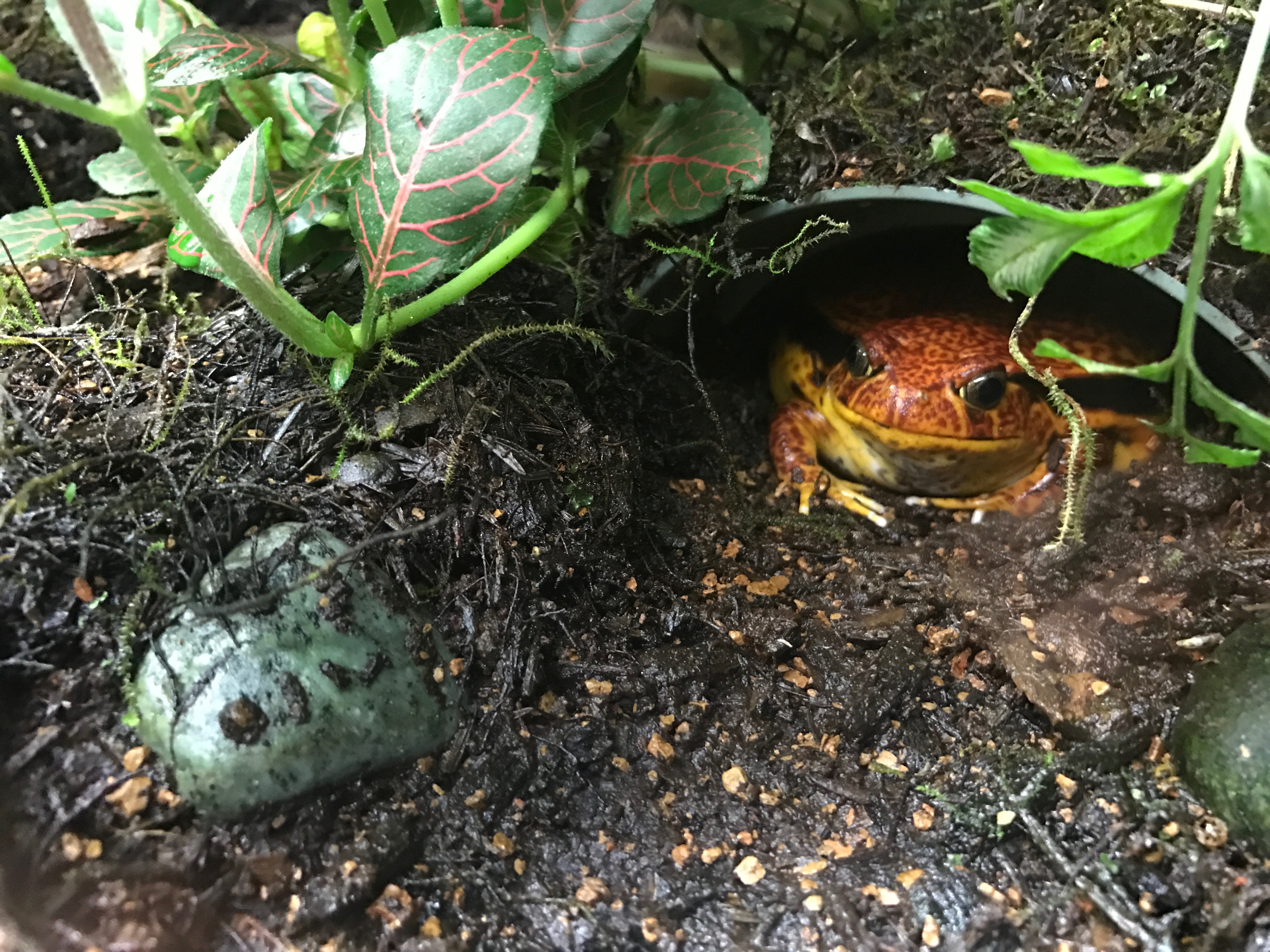
False tomato frog

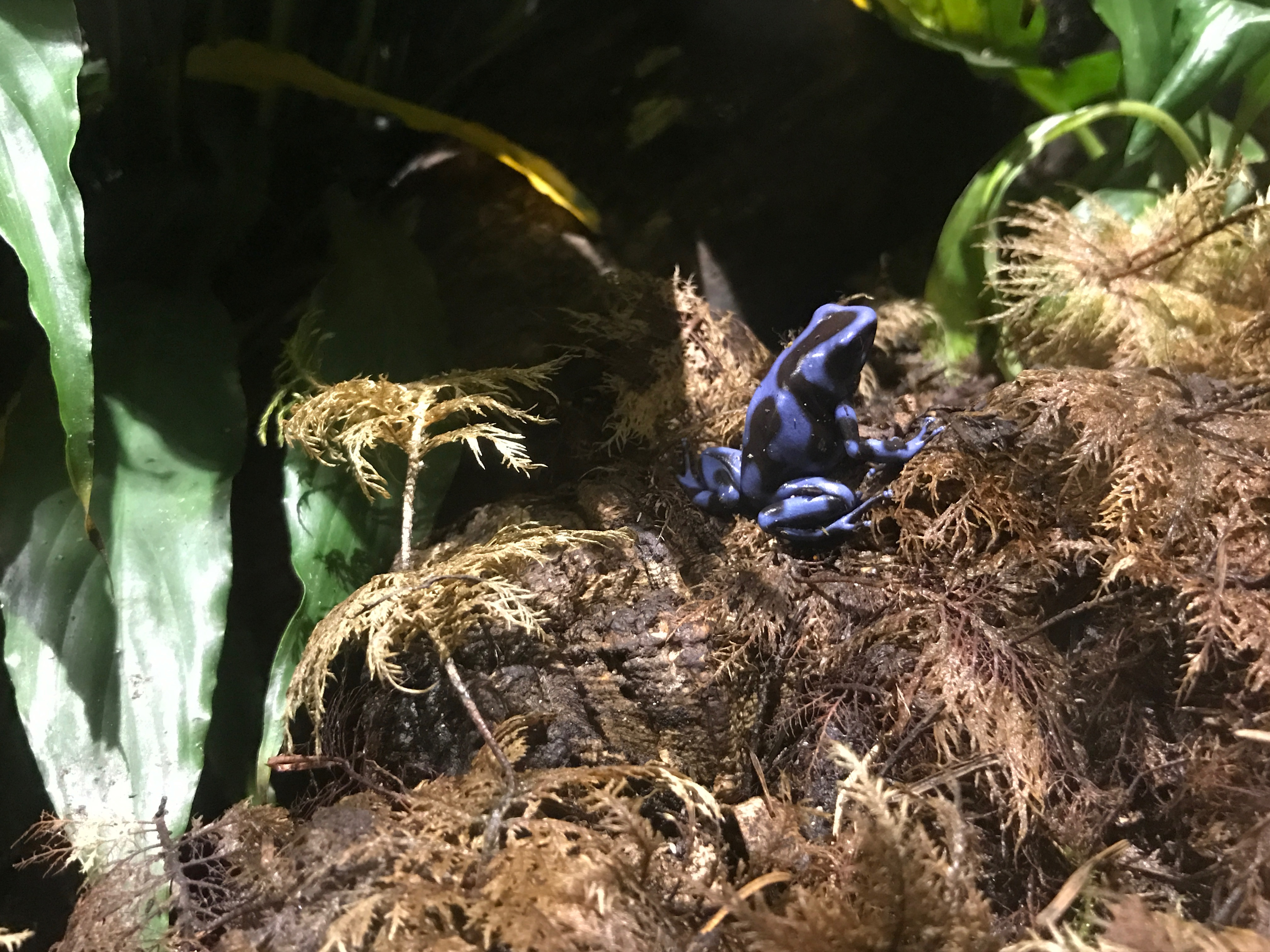
Green and black poison dart frog

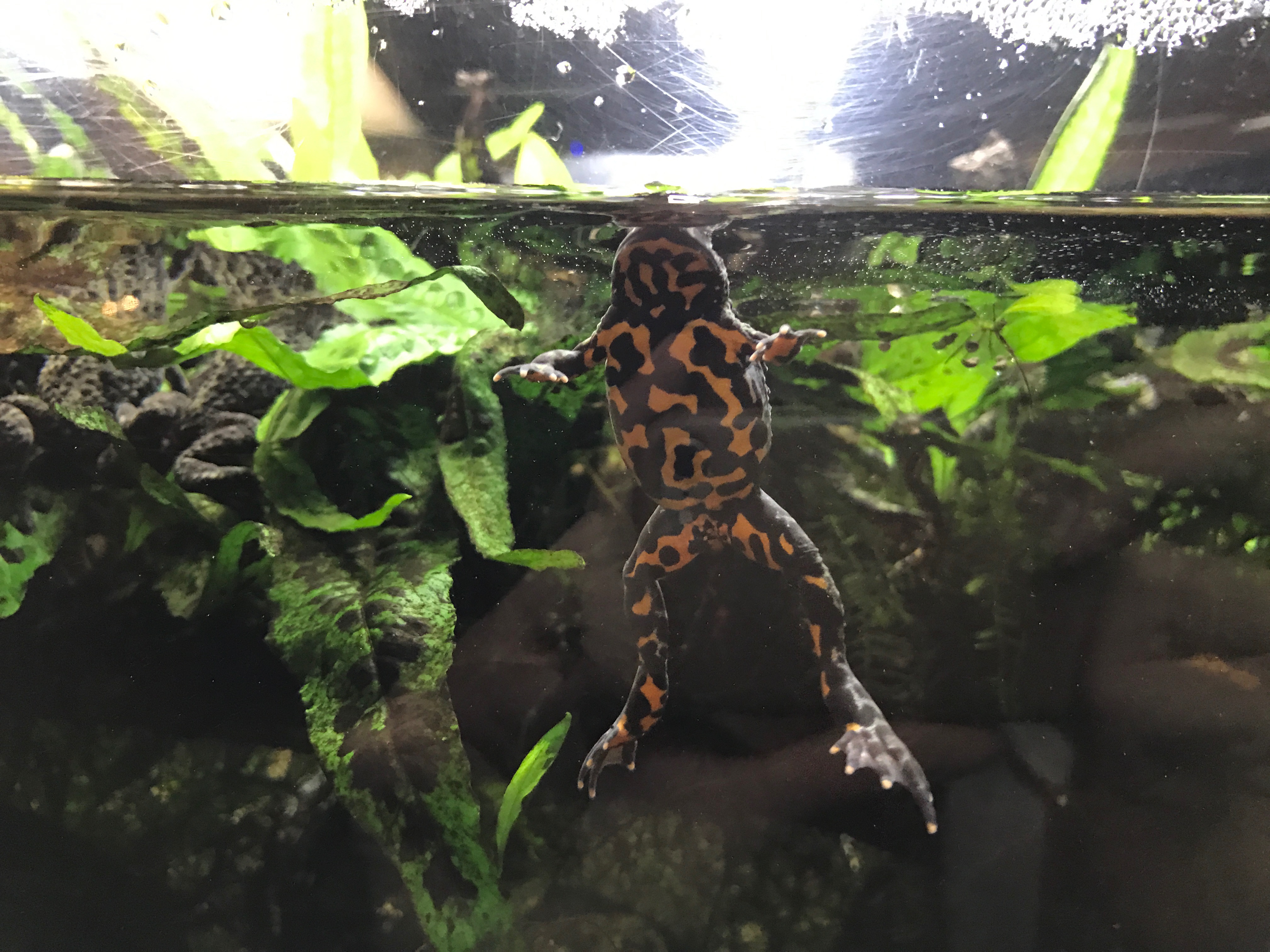
Oriental fire-bellied toad

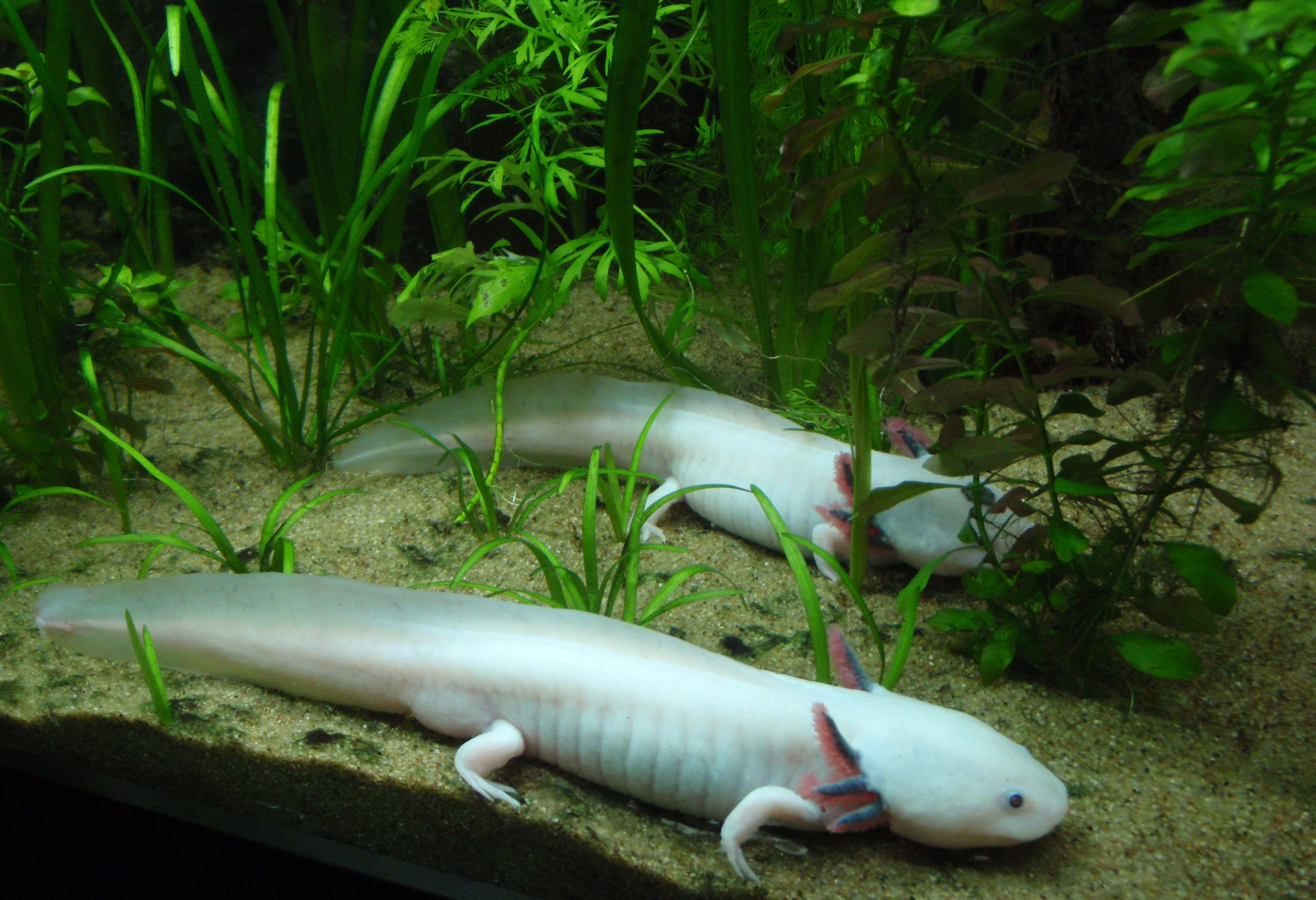
Leucistic axolotls

== Conservation and research programs ==
The Vancouver Aquarium has created and operates a number of conservation and research programs aimed at understanding and preserving animal species in the wild.

=== Marine Mammal Rescue and Rehabilitation Program ===
The Vancouver Aquarium operates a Marine Mammal Rescue program which is aimed at rescuing and rehabilitating marine mammals that are found injured, ill, or abandoned, until they can be re-released into their natural habitats. On average, the Rescue Centre admits approximately 100 distressed marine mammals per year. The vast majority of these are harbour seals, but patients can include sea otters, elephant seals, Steller sea lions, harbour porpoises, and common dolphins. The program notably helped rescue Springer, an orphaned killer whale successfully released and reunited with her family pod. Other high-profile rescues include the successful returning of a beached grey whale back to the water in 2005 and the rescue of Schoona, a lost green sea turtle near Prince Rupert, BC. In October 2013, rescued harbour porpoise Levi became the first cetacean to be rehabilitated at the Marine Mammal Rescue Centre and released back into the wild.

== Ocean Wise ==
Ocean Wise originally started as a sustainable seafood program by Vancouver Aquarium in 2005. In 2017 the non-profit operating the aquarium was rebranded as Ocean Wise Conservation Association encompassing both operations of the aquarium itself and various conservation initiatives. Following the ownership transfer of the aquarium to Herschend in 2021, these initiatives are no longer affiliated with Vancouver Aquarium and remain with Ocean Wise Conservation Association.

=== B.C. Cetacean Sightings Network ===
The B.C. Cetacean Sightings Network is a collaborative conservation and research program between the Vancouver Aquarium and the Department of Fisheries and Oceans Canada aimed at collecting reports and sightings of whales and sea turtles in the wild. The Sightings Network is a network of over 1,800 observers across British Columbia, including whale watching operators, lighthouse keepers, charter boat operators, tugboat captains, BC Ferries personnel, researchers, government employees, recreational boaters and coastal residents. The program aims to solicit reports through the program's website, a toll-free hotline, email, or through the logbook program.

=== Ocean Wise Seafood ===
Established in 2005, the Ocean Wise Seafood program is aimed at promoting sustainable seafood in restaurants, markets and other food service facilities. Its main thrust is to avoid species whose fishing typically causes large bycatches, species from areas where the habitat will degrade if overfished, and species which themselves are overfished. Ocean Wise works directly with food service companies to select sustainable seafood and actively promote them to the general public. The options are highlighted on participating restaurant menus and display cases with the Ocean Wise symbol, to help consumers make environmentally friendly seafood choices. Today, well over 300 restaurants and food stores in Canada are participants in the Ocean Wise sustainable seafood program.

=== Great Canadian Shoreline Cleanup ===
The Great Canadian Shoreline Cleanup is a program that was initiated by the Vancouver Aquarium by a small group of staff members and volunteers in 1994. These employees had heard about the International Coastal Cleanup and decided to participate in it by picking up garbage at a local beach and submitting the information. The Ocean Conservancy's International Coastal Cleanup is an annual international initiative aimed to engage people to remove trash and debris from the world's beaches and waterways, identify the sources of debris, and change the behaviours that cause marine debris in the first place.

Volunteers and sponsors collect and catalogue debris which is then collected for analysis on sources of garbage that enter the ocean. For example, in 2007, 1,240 beach sites with a collective length of 1,772 km were cleaned by 52,263 volunteers bringing in almost 87.5 metric tons of garbage.

== Controversy ==
In 2014, the Vancouver Aquarium's practice of keeping whales, dolphins and porpoises in captivity and its beluga whale breeding program sparked controversy.

In March 2014, two Park Board Commissioners, Sarah Blyth and Constance Barnes, publicly spoke out against the practice of keeping whales and dolphins in captivity at the aquarium. Vancouver Mayor Gregor Robertson, in an emailed letter to The Georgia Straight, expressed his personal belief that "the Vancouver Aquarium should begin to phase out the holding of whales and dolphins in captivity". Primatologist and ethologist Jane Goodall called for the Park Board to follow through with the proposed "phase out" of cetaceans and end the Vancouver Aquarium's captive breeding program.

The Vancouver Aquarium responded to criticism with an open letter in which they explained that it was their policy not to capture cetaceans from the wild and that the aquarium played a role as a home for rescued cetaceans that cannot be returned to the wild.

The Park Board proceeded to commission an independent report from US wildlife veterinarian and scientist Dr. Joseph Gaydos in which he examined the aquarium's animal care standards, accreditation and research and compared it to similar facilities in North America. In his report he found that the Vancouver Aquarium "either meets or exceeds North American industry standards". He also concluded that the aquarium had "an active research department that seems to make good use of studying captive cetaceans, not only for being able to provide better care and understanding of captive animals, but to a greater extent [...] to benefit our understanding and conservation of cetaceans in the wild." Dr. Gaydos also made two recommendations. He recommended that the Park Board conduct "a large-scale scientific study on the welfare of captive housed cetaceans" as a way of assessing "the complex societal issue of captive cetaceans". He also suggested that the Park Board require the aquarium to release an annual report on the state of its cetaceans.

In the media, the Gaydos report was widely received as a positive review of the aquarium's practices and the Vancouver Aquarium also received support from prominent philanthropists and politicians, as well as four former Vancouver mayors. The Monterey Bay Aquarium and the Aquarium of the Pacific in Long Beach, California also spoke out in favour of the Vancouver Aquarium's cetacean program, citing its importance for scientific research.

After a long public debate that ended with the presentation of the Gaydos report and two days of public hearings, the Vancouver Park Board announced in August 2014 that it intended to enact a by-law to ban breeding of cetaceans at the Vancouver Aquarium, and it tasked its staff with drafting an amendment to the existing by-law regulating cetaceans at the aquarium. Vancouver Aquarium CEO Dr. John Nightingale criticized the decision in a public letter, stating that the decision "was not based on the facts or science presented" and that it did not take into consideration "testimony from dozens of the world's scientific community, including experts in animal welfare and animal cognition.".

Following a defeat in the elections to Park Board as part of the 2014 civic elections, a majority of the Park Board commissioners, in their last session, voted against enacting an amendment to the by-law.

=== Federal law banning captivity of cetaceans ===
In 2019, the Ending the Captivity of Whales and Dolphins Act became law in Canada. Two facilities would be affected, Marineland of Canada and the Vancouver Aquarium. When passed in June 2019, Marineland was reported to have 61 cetaceans, while the Vancouver Aquarium had just one dolphin remaining. The law has a grandfather clause, permitting those cetaceans already in captivity to remain where they are, but breeding and further acquisition of cetaceans is prohibited, subject to limited exceptions.

=== Animal cruelty investigation ===
In 2022, the BC SPCA opened an investigation into the Vancouver Aquarium, following a report by the Vancouver Humane Society in regards to concerning animal behaviour and conditions. Footage obtained by the Vancouver Humane Society showed African penguins in a small enclosure, unable to escape public view, standing for long periods of time huddled around a door; sea otters repeatedly trying to peel back the edges of their tank; and a Steller sea lion abnormally sucking on the ground.

== In popular culture ==
The Vancouver Aquarium was featured frequently in the 1980s Canadian series, Danger Bay, which followed the day to day exploits of the Roberts family, led by Grant "Doc" Roberts, a marine veterinarian and his two children, Nicole and Jonah.

A YouTube video featuring two sea otters "holding hands" was recorded at the Vancouver Aquarium. The two sea otters are Nyac and Milo. Nyac died on September 23, 2008. She was one of the last surviving sea otters of the 1989 Exxon Valdez oil spill. The video has been viewed over 19 million times on YouTube. As a result, the Vancouver Aquarium created a live sea otter cam on their website. The YouTube video was originally recorded by Cynthia Holmes. Milo died on January 12, 2012.

The Vancouver Aquarium was also featured in the family film Andre (1994), and romantic comedy Good Luck Chuck (2007), as Cam's workplace. Television movie The Suite Life Movie (2011) used the aquarium as the research firm where Cody Martin interns.

On September 5, 2008, Hayden Panettiere appeared on the Late Show with David Letterman and talked about her visit with the rescue dolphins at the Vancouver Aquarium.

The song "Baby Beluga" by Raffi was inspired by Kavna, a beluga that he saw while visiting the Vancouver Aquarium.

Parts of the 2026 American film Remarkably Bright Creatures were filmed at the Vancouver Aquarium. The production team utilized extensive footage of Agnetha, a Giant Pacific octopus.
