= MCherry =

Monomeric red fluorescent protein

mCherry is a member of the mFruits family of monomeric red fluorescent proteins (mRFPs). As an RFP, mCherry was derived from DsRed of Discosoma sea anemones, unlike green fluorescent proteins (GFPs), which are often derived from Aequorea victoria jellyfish. Fluorescent proteins are used to tag components in cells so that they can be studied using fluorescence spectroscopy and fluorescence microscopy. mCherry absorbs light between 540 and 590 nm and emits light in the range of 550-650 nm. mCherry belongs to the group of fluorescent protein chromophores used as instruments to visualize genes and analyze their functions in experiments. Genome editing has been improved greatly through the precise insertion of these fluorescent protein tags into the genetic material of many diverse organisms. Most comparisons between the brightness and photostability of different fluorescent proteins have been made in vitro, removed from biological variables that affect protein performance in cells or organisms. It is hard to perfectly simulate cellular environments in vitro, and the difference in environment could have an effect on the brightness and photostability.

mRFPs—like mCherry—are useful because they have a lower molecular weight and fold faster than tetramers, which results in reduced disturbance of the target system.

== Development ==
DsRed is isolated from Discosoma sea anemones, and is a tetrameric protein. Most red fluorescent proteins come from DsRed. DsRed has low photostability (resistance to change under the influence of light) and a slow maturation rate (time until half the protein is folded). mRFP1 is derived from DsRed and is a monomer so it is smaller, but its quantum yield and photostability are less than that of DsRed. mCherry and other mFruits have improved brightness and photostability over both DsRed and mRFP1. mCherry was developed through directed evolution from mRFP1 by the group of Roger Tsien at UCSD. The mFruits in general were developed because, while different colored proteins could be found from other anthozoans, the proteins would mostly be tetramers, which would most likely have the same issues as DsRed. These tetramers would require derivations like those done to DsRed to be done in order to make them useful fusion partners. As a result, the mFruits were derived from mRFP1 by adjusting key amino acids in order to adjust the excitation and emission wavelengths. Different colors allow for the tracking of different cell types, transcriptional activity, and fusion in proteins. mCherry, out of all of the true monomers developed, has the longest wavelengths, highest photostability, fastest maturation, excellent pH resistance, and is closest to mRFP1 in its excitation and emission maxima. However, mCherry has a lower quantum yield than mRFP1.

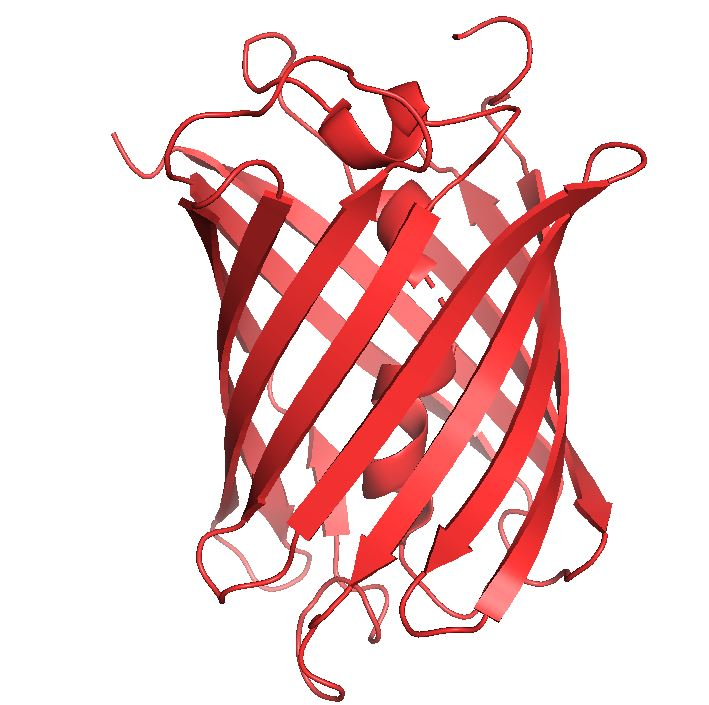
Protein structure of mCherry. PDB ID: 2H5Q

== Structure ==
The gene for mCherry is 711bp long, and the protein is made up of 236 residues with a mass of 26.722 kDa. The crystal structure of mCherry was determined in 2006. It contains 3 alpha helices and 13 beta sheets which make up the beta barrel. The chromophore in mCherry is made up of three amino acids, methionine, tyrosine, and glycine, which are post-translationally modified into an imidazolinone. The number of these residues in sequence are 71, 72, and 73, respectively. The extended pi-electron conjugation gives mCherry its red-shifted absorbance and emission. The chromophore forms from a central helix which is shielded from solvent in an 11-stranded beta barrel. This structure is almost identical to the tertiary structure of DsRed which also has an 11-stranded beta barrel, and is similar to GFPs tertiary structure. This makes the environment around the chromophore in mCherry more hydrophobic than the environment around the chromophore of DsRed. The end termini on mCherry are GFP-like, which allows it to be incorporated in to systems where GFP can be used and mRFP1 could not have been used.

== Uses ==
mCherry is used in fluorescence microscopy as an intracellular probe. However, when a protein is tagged by fusion to a fluorescent protein, interactions between them can undesirably disturb targeting or function.

mCherry is valued where constitutive gene expression is desired, and other experimental approaches require the coordinated control of multiple genes. While multiple venues have been developed for use in E. coli and other models, the utility and functionality of such techniques does not always translate to other species. For example, for the Gram-negative pathogen Legionella pneumophila, a vector for Legionnaires' Disease, the Ptac system represents the only well-established expression control system. In order to enhance the tools available to study bacterial gene expression in L. pneumophila, mCherry was developed, which confers constitutive gene expression from a mutagenized LacI binding site. mCherry neither interferes with other plasmids harboring an intact LacI-Ptac expression system nor alters the growth of Legionella species during intracellular growth. The broad-host-range plasmid backbone of mCherry allowed constitutive gene expression in a wide variety of Gram-negative bacterial species, making mCherry a useful tool for the greater research community.

It can be used to label bacteria to visualize them without antibiotic pressure and also be used as a long-wavelength hetero-FRET (fluorescence resonant energy transfer) acceptor and probe for homo-FRET experiments. FRET is a type of fluorescence energy transfer where there is no intermediate photon and the energy is transferred from the donor to the acceptor.

== Other RFPs and mFruits ==
Original RFP: DsRed

First Generation RFP: mRFP1

Second Generation RFPs: mStrawberry, mOrange, dTomato

mFruits are second-generation monomeric red fluorescent proteins (mRFPs) that have improved brightness and photostability compared to the first-generation mRFP1. Their emission and excitation wavelengths are distributed over a range of about 550−650 and 540−590 nm, respectively. However, the variations in their spectra can be traced back to a few key amino acids. Spectroscopic and atomic resolution crystallographic analyses of three representatives, mOrange, mStrawberry, and mCherry, reveal that different mechanisms operate to establish the excitation and emission maxima. Undergoing a second oxidation step, each mFruit produces an acylimine linkage in the polypeptide backbone. In comparison to the progenitor DsRed, direct covalent modification to this linkage (mOrange) and indirect modification of the chromophore environment (mStrawberry and mCherry) produces strong blue- and red-shifted variants. The blue shift of mOrange is induced by a covalent modification of its protein backbone.

The electron-density map indicates the formation of a third heterocycle, 2-hydroxy-dihydrooxazole, upon the reaction of Thr 66 Oγ with the polypeptide backbone, which in turn reduces the conjugation of the carbonyl at position 65 with the rest of the chromophore. In mStrawberry and mCherry, the movement of charged Lys 70 and protonation of Glu 215 are proposed to modify the chromophore electron-density distribution, inducing their signature red shift.
