= Nathan Shaner =

Neuroscientist and biologist

Nathan C. Shaner
- Citizenship: United States
- Education: Oberlin College (BA); University of California, San Diego; (PhD)
- Known for: mCherry
- Scientific career
- Fields: Biochemistry
- Institutions: University of California, San Diego; Scintillon Institute
- Thesis: Engineering novel fluorescent proteins (2006)
- Doctoral advisor: Roger Tsien
- Website: biosensors.ucsd.edu

Nathan Shaner is a researcher in the field of neuroscience and biotechnology, known for his contributions to the development of fluorescent proteins and optogenetic tools. Using directed evolution, he has created fluorescent proteins, including mNeonGreen, mCherry, and dTomato. Shaner discovers new, naturally occurring bioluminescent and fluorescent molecules, and engineers improved variants for biological research applications, such as imaging. He is part of the bioluminescence hub, a research group dedicated to applying bioluminescent probes to neuroscience and optogenetics.

Shaner's recent work includes engineering photoactivatable fluorescent proteins, and creating bioluminescent proteins that fluorescence resonance energy transfer (FRET) with fluorescent proteins. He currently holds the title of Associate Adjunct Professor in Neurosciences at the University of California San Diego.

== Education and early career ==
As an undergraduate at Oberlin College, he studied physics and music composition. After graduating from Oberlin in 1999, he was admitted into Princeton's physics graduate program, but left when he realized he did not want to continue in that field. As an assistant in the University of Pennsylvania labs of cell biologists Joseph and Jean Sanger, Shaner learned about tissue culture and microscopy, and had his first experiences with fluorescent proteins.

Shaner graduated with a Ph.D. in biomedical sciences from the University of California, San Diego in 2006.

== Research and career ==
With Nobel laureate Roger Tsien as his advisor, Shaner diversified mRFP1 to create a rainbow of fluorescent proteins including mOrange, dTomato, and mCherry in a 2004 Nature Biotechnology paper for his Ph.D. thesis.

He co-founded the Scintillon research institute in 2012 alongside Jiwu Wang, the CEO of Allele Biotechnology. The institution focuses on antibody development, stem cell line services among other biotechnology-related ventures. Since 2019, Shaner's lab has been located at UC San Diego.

As of October 2023 Shaner has over 15,000 citations.
