= Macmillan catalyst =

Stereoselective organic catalyst

First generation catalyst

Second generation catalyst

A Macmillan catalyst is a type of imidazolidinone organocatalyst. They are used for enantioselective synthesis because they catalyze reactions that produce only one enantiomer of a desired product. They work by forming an iminium ion that lowers the LUMO of the substrate, which enables catalysis of various reactions, including Diels-Alder reactions, Friedel-Crafts reactions, and nitrone additions. They are named after David MacMillan, and his research on them won him the Nobel prize in chemistry in 2021 " [...] for the development of asymmetric organocatalysis".

== Structure ==
The two generations share the same main framework of a chiral 4-imidazolidinone core with a methyl group on the 3 position, a carbonyl on the 4 position, and a phenyl group on the 5 position. For the first generation catalyst, there are two methyl groups on the 2 position, but in the 2nd generation, there is a tert-butyl group, which was found to help with reactivity on certain reactions compared to the two methyl groups of the first generation. When activated, the nitrogen on the 1 position becomes positively charged, turning it into an iminium ion, selectively forming the E isomer. The catalysts are synthesized from methyl amides, which are cyclized into the desired imidazolidinone.

== Uses ==
These compounds have been shown to have excellent catalytic activity in cycloaddition reactions, Diels-Alder reactions, addition reactions, transfer hydrogenation, and organocatalytic cascade reactions. Their catalysis is notable because they are organic, compared to most catalysts, which are made out of sometimes toxic transition metals. These properties lend them well to quick, large scale synthesis of various pharmaceuticals.
