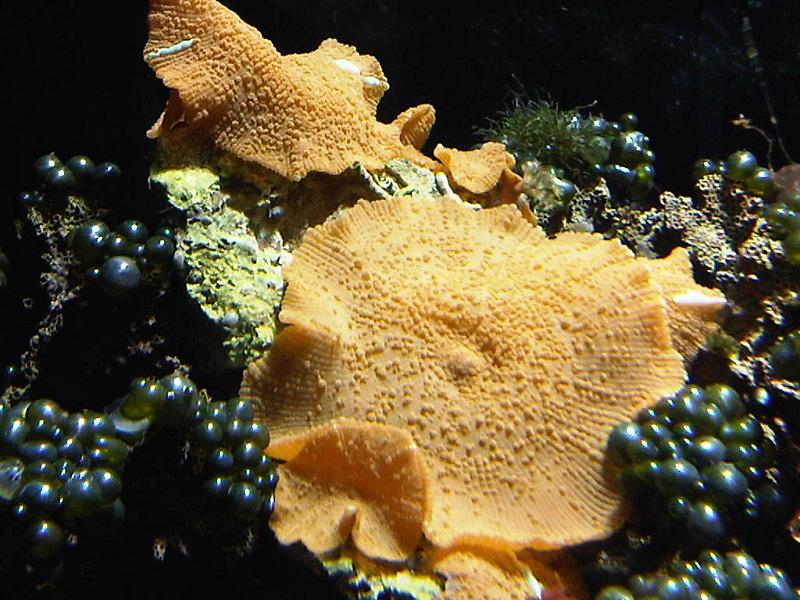

Scientific classification
- Domain: Eukaryota
- Kingdom: Animalia
- Phylum: Cnidaria
- Class: Hexacorallia
- Order: Corallimorpharia
- Family: Discosomidae
- Genus: Discosoma
- Species: D. nummiforme

Binomial name
- Discosoma nummiforme Rüppell & Leuckart, 1828

Synonyms
- Actinodiscus nummiformis; Discosoma nummiforma Rüppell & Leuckart, 1828; Discostoma nummiforme Rüppell & Leuckart, 1828

= Discosoma nummiforme =

Genus of corals

Discosoma nummiforme is a species of cnidarian in the genus Discosoma and is relatively small in size and dimensions, while also possessing a pentagonal-shaped disk, the species itself very rarely exceeds past 2 inches in diameter, however, it is compensated for the variety of colours it exceeds throughout specimens. The species was first discovered at the Adolphus Island in Torres Strait by Rüppell and Leuckart in 1828.

== Description ==
Discosoma nummiforme possess a pentagonal-shaped disk which rarely exceeds 2 inches in diameter; however, it is compensated for the variety of rich colours some specimens of this species can possess in the wild. The disk, and the supporting column, can be found in a rich purple-brown colour. The almost entirely sessile tentacles, which are spheroidal in shape, can sometimes be found as a brilliant emerald-green colour; however, some in the species inner confines are found as the same purple-brown colour.
