= Imidazolidinone =

5-membered ring organonitrogen heterocycle

Chemical structure of 2-imidazolidinone

Chemical structure of 4-imidazolidinone

Imidazolidinones are a class of 5-membered ring heterocycles structurally related to imidazolidine. Imidazolidinones feature a saturated C_{3}N_{2} nucleus, except for the presence of a urea or amide functional group in the 2 or 4 positions.

== 2-Imidazolidinones ==
The 2-imidazolidinones are cyclic derivatives of urea. 1,3-Dimethyl-2-imidazolidinone is a polar solvent and Lewis base. Drugs featuring this ring system include emicerfont, imidapril, and azlocillin. Dimethylol ethylene urea is the reagent used in permanent press clothing. 2-Imidazolidinone is used as a formaldehyde scavenger in amino-resin systems and textile finishes.

== 4-Imidazolidinones ==
4-Imidazolidinones can be prepared from phenylalanine in two chemical steps (amidation with methylamine followed by condensation reaction with acetone):

Imidazolidinone catalyst work by forming an iminium ion with carbonyl groups of α,β-unsaturated aldehydes (enals) and enones in a rapid chemical equilibrium. This iminium activation lowers the substrate's LUMO. Several 4-imidazolidinones have been investigated.

Drugs featuring the 4-imidazolidinone ring include hetacillin, NNC 63-0532, spiperone, and spiroxatrine.

== Imidazolones or imidazolinone ==
Imidazolones (also called imidazolinones) are oxo derivatives of imidazoline (dihydroimidazoles). Examples include imidazol-4-one-5-propionic acid, a product of the catabolism of histidine, and imazaquin, a member of the imidazolinone class of herbicide.
