= Yellow fluorescent protein =

Genetic mutant of green fluorescent protein

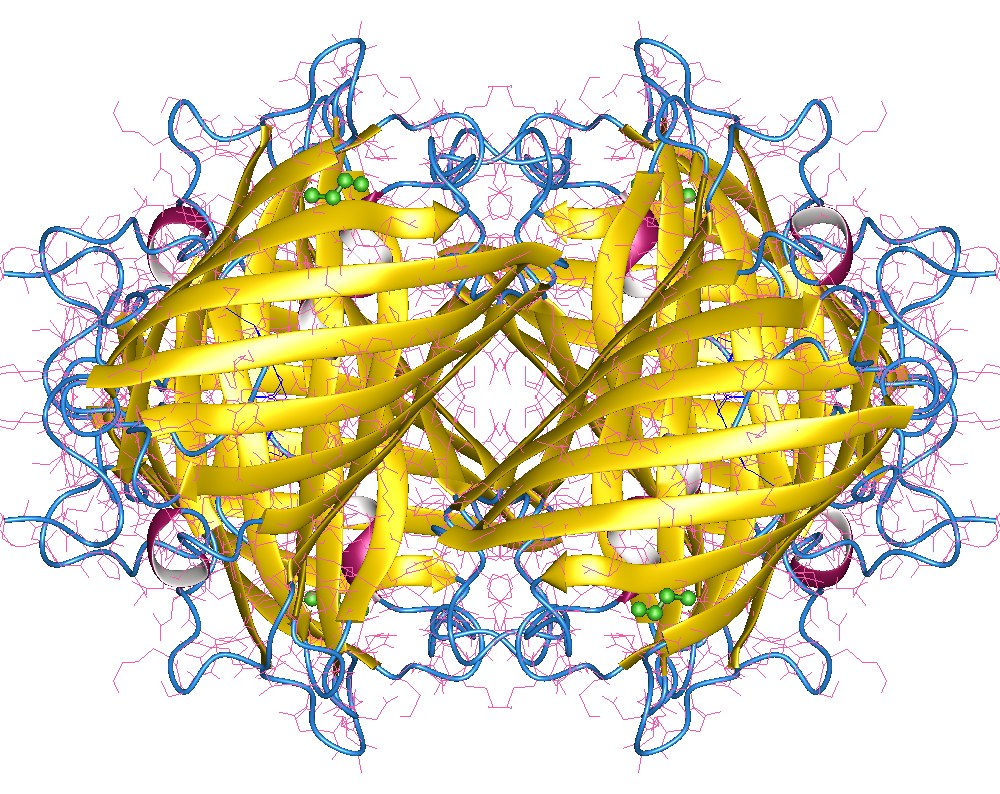
Yellow fluorescent protein, Zoanthus

Yellow fluorescent protein (YFP) is a genetic mutant of green fluorescent protein (GFP) originally derived from the jellyfish Aequorea victoria. Its excitation peak is 513 nm and its emission peak is 527 nm. Like the parent GFP, YFP is a useful tool in cell and molecular biology because the excitation and emission peaks of YFP are distinguishable from GFP which allows for the study of multiple processes/proteins within the same experiment.

Three improved versions of YFP are Citrine, Venus, and Ypet. They have reduced chloride sensitivity, faster maturation, and increased brightness (defined as the product of the extinction coefficient and quantum yield). Typically, YFP serves as the acceptor for genetically-encoded FRET sensors of which the most likely donor FP is monomeric cyan fluorescent protein (mCFP). The red-shift relative to GFP is caused by a Pi-Pi stacking interaction as a result of the T203Y substitution introduced by mutation, which essentially increases the polarizability of the local chromophore environment as well as providing additional electron density into the chromophore.

"Venus" contains a novel amino acid substitution –F46L– which accelerates the oxidation of the chromophore at 37°C, the rate limiting step of maturation. The protein has other substitutions (F64L/ M153T/ V163A/ S175G), permitting Venus to fold well and giving it relative tolerance to acidosis and Cl^{−}.

== Evolution of YFP from GFP ==
Four protein mutations from the wild-type GFP found in Aequorea Victoria jellyfish were needed to create the YFP mutant. The most important mutation was the replacement of threonine with tyrosine at residue position 203 (the substitution is denoted by T203Y, where T and Y represent the single letter code for the amino acids threonine and tyrosine, respectively).

== See also ==
- Red fluorescent protein
