= Red fluorescent protein =

Protein which acts as a fluorophore

Red fluorescent protein drFP583

Identifiers
- Organism: Discosoma sp.
- Symbol: ?
- Orthologs: OMA: entry
- UniProt: Q9U6Y8
Search for
- Structures: Swiss-model
- Domains: InterPro

Bioluminescence response to local Ca^{2+} after intraperitoneal injection of recombinant tdTA in an anesthetized mouse. An overlay of the mouse reflection image (grayscale) and Ca^{2+}-induced bioluminescence (red pseudocolor) is shown.

Red fluorescent protein (RFP) is a protein which acts as a fluorophore, fluorescing red-orange when excited. The original variant occurs naturally in the coral genus Discosoma, and is named DsRed. Several new variants have been developed using directed mutagenesis which fluoresce orange, red, and far-red.

== Characteristics and properties ==
Like GFP and other fluorescent proteins, RFP is a barrel-shaped protein made primarily out of β-sheet motifs; this type of protein fold is commonly known as a β-barrel.

The mass of RFP is approximately 25.9 kDa. Its excitation maximum is 558 nm, and its emission maximum is 583 nm.

== Applications ==
RFP is frequently used in molecular biology research as a fluorescent marker, for a variety of purposes.

Issues with fluorescent proteins include the length of time between protein synthesis and expression of fluorescence. DsRed has a maturation time of around 24 hours, which renders it unsuited for experiments that take place over a shorter time frame. Additionally, DsRed exists in a tetrameric form, which can affect the function of proteins to which it is attached. Genetic engineering has improved the utility of RFP by increasing the speed of fluorescence development and creating monomeric variants. Improved variants of RFP include the mFruits variants (mCherry, mOrange, mRaspberry), mKO, TagRFP, mKate, mRuby, FusionRed, mScarlet and DsRed-Express.

In contrast to many engineered monomeric red fluorescent proteins, tdTomato is derived from DsRed through directed evolution and is characterized by low acid sensitivity. Originating from Discosoma species, tdTomato is reported to be six times brighter than enhanced green fluorescent protein (EGFP), with excitation and emission peaks at 554 nm and 581 nm, respectively. Although it is a tandem dimer, tdTomato behaves as a functional monomer in fusion constructs. It is commonly used as an endoplasmic reticulum (ER) marker in various plant species for both transient and stable expression, and as a reporter gene to monitor gene expression, protein localization, and cell behavior.

== Other fluorescent proteins ==
The first fluorescent protein to be discovered, green fluorescent protein (GFP), has been adapted to identify and develop fluorescent markers in other colors. Variants such as yellow fluorescent protein (YFP) and cyan fluorescent protein (CFP) were discovered in Anthozoa.

== See also ==
- Cyan fluorescent protein (CFP)
- Green fluorescent protein (GFP)
- Yellow fluorescent protein (YFP)
