= 2-Imidazolidinone =

Names
- Preferred IUPAC name Imidazolidin-2-one
- Other names: Ethyleneurea; 2-imidazolidone; imidazolidin-2-one; 1,3-ethyleneurea

Identifiers
CAS Number	120-93-4
3D model (JSmol)	Interactive image
ChEBI	CHEBI:37001
ChEMBL	ChEMBL12034
ChemSpider	8142
ECHA InfoCard	100.004.034
EC Number	204-436-4
PubChem CID	8453
UNII	2K48456N55
CompTox Dashboard (EPA)	DTXSID0020602
- InChI: InChI=1S/C3H6N2O/c6-3-4-1-2-5-3/h1-2H2,(H2,4,5,6) Key: YAMHXTCMCPHKLN-UHFFFAOYSA-N
- SMILES: O=C1NCCN1

Properties
Chemical formula	C_{3}H_{6}N_{2}O
Molar mass	86.094 g·mol^{−1}
Appearance	White to off-white crystalline solidref name=PubChem
Density	1.15 g/cm^{3}
Melting point	129–132 °C
Solubility in water	Soluble in water and methanol

Hazards
- Occupational safety and health (OHS/OSH)
Main hazards	Irritant
- GHS labelling
Pictograms	(GHS07: Exclamation mark)
Signal word	Warning
Hazard statements	H315, H319, H335
Precautionary statements	P261, P264, P280, P302+P352, P305+P351+P338
Safety data sheet (SDS)	Sigma-Aldrich SDS
- Except where otherwise noted, data are given for materials in their standard state (at 25 °C [77 °F], 100 kPa). Infobox references

2-Imidazolidinone (imidazolidin-2-one) is a cyclic urea derivative. It is used as an intermediate in organic synthesis and as a building block for substituted imidazolidinones.

== Uses ==
2-Imidazolidinone is principally used as a formaldehyde scavenger in amino-resin systems and textile finishes. It reacts with free formaldehyde and with pendant N-methylol groups to form stable adducts, lowering free formaldehyde content and emissions. Applications include incorporation as an internal additive in urea-formaldehyde adhesives or as a post-treatment in textile finishing baths and on wood-based panels. Reported usage levels vary by application, commonly around 5–10% by weight relative to resin solids for internal scavenging, and 10–40% in commercial aqueous scavenger concentrates for surface or post-treatment applications. Careful optimization of resin formulation and curing is necessary to avoid adverse effects on bonding strength and cure behavior.

== Preparation ==
2-Imidazolidinone can be obtained by the direct condensation of ethylenediamine with urea or dimethyl carbonate:

C_{2}H_{4}(NH_{2})_{2} + CO(NH_{2})_{2} → C_{3}H_{6}N_{2}O + 2 NH_{3}

H_{2}N–CH_{2}–CH_{2}–NH_{2} + (MeO)_{2}CO → C_{3}H_{6}N_{2}O + 2 MeOH

It can also be obtained by the direct condensation of ethylene glycol and urea:

CO(NH_{2})_{2} + HO–CH_{2}–CH_{2}–OH → C_{3}H_{6}N_{2}O + 2 H_{2}O
