= Iminium =

Polyatomic ion of the form >C=N< and charge +1

The general structure of an iminium cation

In organic chemistry, an iminium cation is a polyatomic ion with the general structure [R^{1}R^{2}C=NR^{3}R^{4}]^{+}. They are common in synthetic chemistry and biology.

== Structure ==
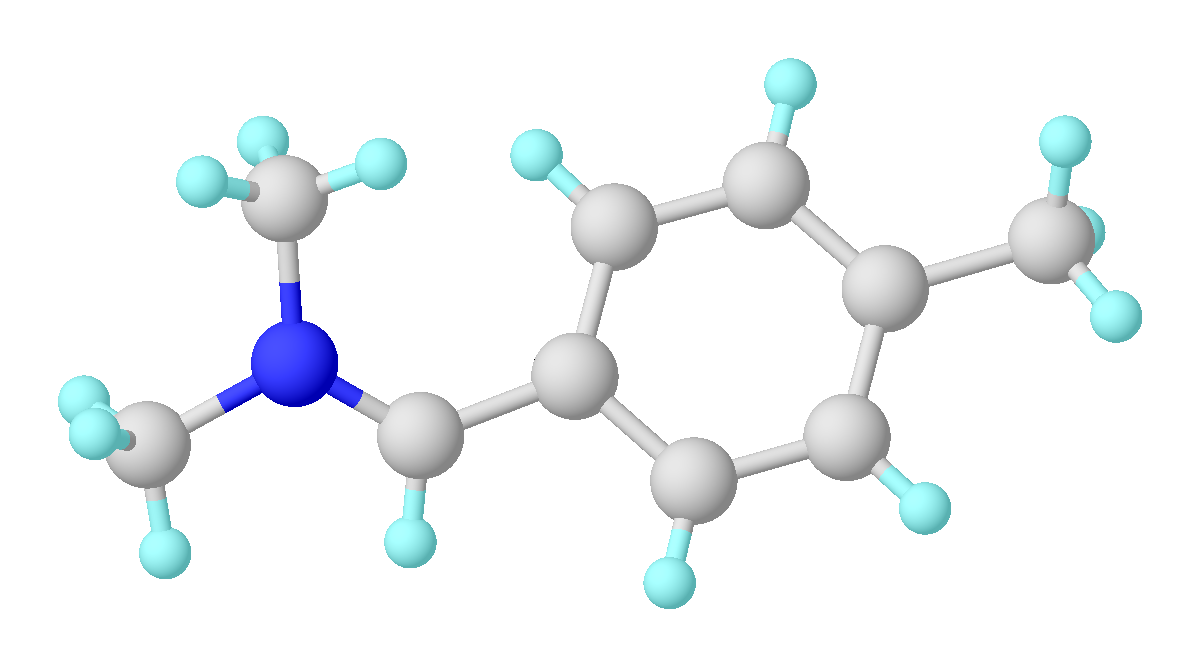
Structure of the cation in the salt [Me_{2}N=C(H)tolyl]^{+}OTf^{−} illustrating the near planarity of the iminium functional group.

Iminium cations adopt alkene-like geometries: the central C=N unit is nearly coplanar with all four substituents. Unsymmetrical iminium cations can exist as cis and trans isomers. The C=N bonds, which are near 129 picometers in length, are shorter than C-N single bonds. Cis/trans isomers are observed. The C=N distance is slightly shorter in iminium cations than in the parent imine, and computational studies indicate that the C=N bonding is also stronger in iminium vs imine, although the C=N distance contracts only slightly. These results indicate that the barrier for rotation is higher than in the parent imines.

== Formation ==
Iminium cations are obtained by protonation and alkylation of imines:

R'N=CR_{2} + H^{+} → [R'NH=CR_{2}]^{+}
R'N=CR_{2} + R^{+} → [R'RN=CR_{2}]^{+}

They also are generated by the condensation of secondary amines with ketones or aldehydes:

O=CR_{2} + R'_{2}NH + H^{+} ⇌ [R'_{2}N=CR_{2}]^{+} + H_{2}O

This rapid, reversible reaction is one step in "iminium catalysis".

More exotic routes to iminium cations are known, e.g. from ring-opening reactions of pyridine.

== Occurrence ==
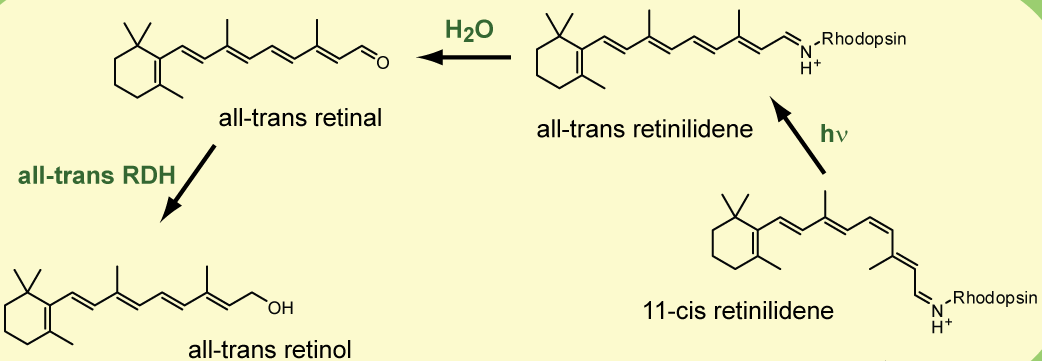
Iminium compounds are intermediates in the vision cycle of rhodopsin.

Iminium derivatives are common in biology. Pyridoxal phosphate reacts with amino acids to give iminium derivatives. Many iminium salts are encountered in synthetic organic chemistry.

"Eschenmoser's salt" is a well known example of an iminium salt.

== Reactions ==
Iminium salts hydrolyse to give the corresponding ketone or aldehyde:

[R_{2}N=CR_{2}]^{+} + H_{2}O → [R_{2}NH_{2}]^{+} + O=CR_{2}

Iminium cations are reduced to the amines, e.g. by sodium cyanoborohydride. Iminium cations are intermediates in the reductive amination of ketones and aldehydes.

In a related reaction, iminium cations (lacking N-H bonds) add carbanion equivalents, such as Grignard reagents.

Unsymmetrical iminium cations undergo cis-trans isomerization. The isomerization is catalyzed by nucleophiles, which add to the unsaturated carbon, breaking the C=N double bond.

=== Named reactions involving iminium species ===
- Aza-Cope rearrangement
- Beckmann rearrangement
- Duff reaction
- Mannich reaction
- Pictet-Spengler reaction
- Stephen aldehyde synthesis
- Stork enamine alkylation
- Vilsmeier-Haack reaction and Vilsmeier reagent

== Iminylium ions ==
Iminylium ions have the general structure R_{2}C=N^{+}. They form a subclass of nitrenium ions.

== See also ==
- Ammonium
- Imine
- Quaternary ammonium cation
- Macmillan catalyst
