= Discosoma =

- A red mushroom coral

Scientific classification
- Kingdom: Animalia
- Phylum: Cnidaria
- Subphylum: Anthozoa
- Class: Hexacorallia
- Order: Corallimorpharia
- Family: Discosomidae
- Genus: Discosoma; Rüppell & Leuckart, 1828

Species
- See text

Synonyms
- Actinodiscus de Blainville, 1830

Genus of corals

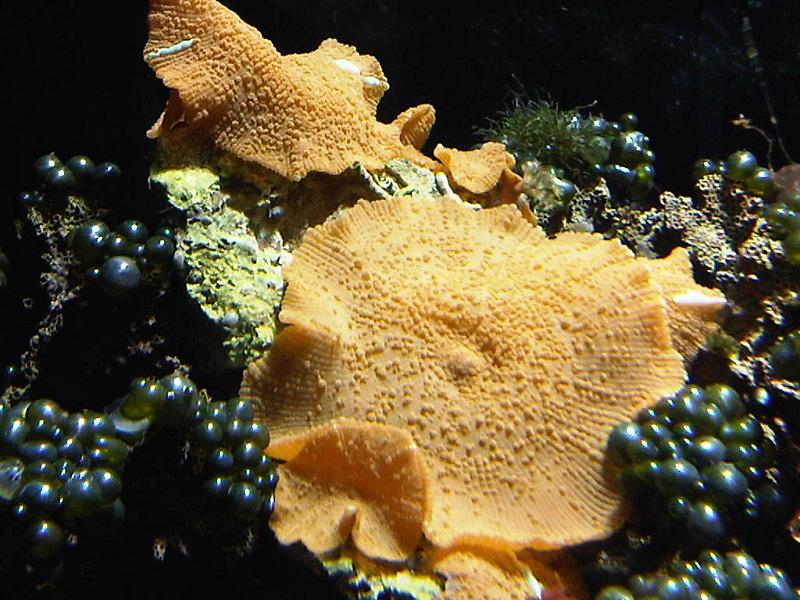
Discosoma nummiforme

Discosoma is a genus of cnidarians in the order Corallimorpharia. Common names for the genus include mushroom anemone, disc anemone and elephant ear mushroom.

Most species are disc-shaped and produce large amounts of mucus. There are a great variety of colors, including metallic and fluorescent shades and striped and spotted patterns. Discosoma gather food particles from the water. Some species absorb nutrients produced by zooxanthellae, photosynthetic dinoflagellates living in their tissues in a symbiotic relationship.

Some species are sold commercially in the aquarium trade.

The family of red fluorescent proteins which have applications in molecular biology as reporter proteins was first derived from the species.

There are approximately 11 recognized species:

- Discosoma album
- Discosoma carlgreni – Forked-tentacle corallimorpharian
- Discosoma dawydoffi
- Discosoma fowleri
- Discosoma fungiforme
- Discosoma molle
- Discosoma neglecta – Umbrella corallimorpharian
- Discosoma nummiforme
- Discosoma rubraoris
- Discosoma unguja
- Discosoma viridescens
