= Eos (protein) =

Photoactivatable fluorescent protein

EosFP is a photoactivatable green to red fluorescent protein. Its green fluorescence (516 nm) switches to red (581 nm) upon UV irradiation of ~390 nm (violet/blue light) due to a photo-induced modification resulting from a break in the peptide backbone near the chromophore. Eos was first discovered as a tetrameric protein in the stony coral Lobophyllia hemprichii. Like other fluorescent proteins, Eos allows for applications such as the tracking of fusion proteins, multicolour labelling and tracking of cell movement. Several variants of Eos have been engineered for use in specific study systems including mEos2, mEos4 and CaMPARI.

== History ==
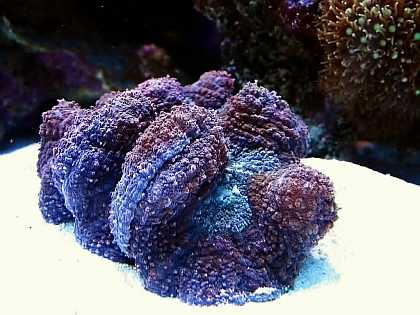
The stony coral, Lobophyllia hemprichii, from which EosFP was discovered.

EosFP was first discovered in 2005 during a large scale screen for PAFPs (photoactivatable fluorescent proteins) within the stony coral Lobophyllia hemprichii. It has since been successfully cloned in Escherichia coli and fusion constructs have been developed for use in human cells. Eos was named after the Greek goddess of dawn.

Unlike the tetrameric fluorescent proteins derived from anthozoan coral, which can interfere with normal cellular function due to interactions between protein subunits, EosFP has been broken up into dimeric and monomeric variants through the introduction of single point mutations. These variants have been successful in the tracking of cellular components without disturbing function in the host cell and maintain the same photophysical properties as wild-type Eos.

Since their discovery, monomeric Eos probes (mEos) have been shown to localize in the cytosol, plasma membrane, endosomes, prevacuolar vesicles, vacuoles, the endoplasmic reticulum, golgi bodies, peroxisomes, mitochondria, invaginations, filamentous actin and cortical microtubules. mEos fusion proteins allow for differential colour labelling in single cells, or groups of cells in developing organs. They can also be used for the understanding of spatial/ temporal interactions between organelles and vesicles. The two fluorescent forms of mEosFP (green and red) are compatible with CFP, GFP, YFP and RFP for multicolour labelling.

== Function ==
EosFP emits a strong green fluorescence (516 nm) that changes irreversibly to red (581 nm) when irradiated with UV-light of 390 nm. This modification occurs due to a break in the peptide backbone next to the chromophore. This mechanism allows for localized tagging of the protein and makes EosFP an appropriate tool for tracking protein movement within living cells. Formation of the red chromophore involves cleaving the peptide backbone but includes almost no other changes in the protein structure.

According to single-molecule fluorescence spectroscopy, EosFP is tetrameric, and exhibits strong Forster resonance coupling within individual fluorophores. Like other fluorescent proteins, Eos can be used to report diverse signals in cells, tissues and organs without disturbing complex biological machinery. While the use of fluorescent proteins was once limited to the green fluorescent protein (GFP), in recent years many other fluorescent proteins have been cloned. Unlike GFPs, which are derived from the luminescent jellyfish Aequorea victoria, fluorescent proteins derived from anthozoa, including Eos, emit fluorescence in the red spectral range. The novel property of photoinduced green-to-red conversion in Eos is useful because it allows for localized tracking of proteins in living cells. EosFP is unique because it has a large separation in the wavelengths it can emit which allows for easy identification of peak colours. All green-to-red photoinducible fluorescent proteins, including Eos, contain a chromophoric unit derived from the tripeptide his-tyr-gly. This green-to-red conversion is completed by light rather than chemical oxidation such as in other FPs.

== Structure and Absorbance Properties ==
A representation of photofluorescent EosFP in its green form (~516m) obtained from the Protein Data Bank (PDB) through X-ray diffraction.

=== Primary structure ===
EosFP consists of 226 amino acids. It has a molecular mass of 25.8 kDa and its pI is 6.9. Eos has 84% identical residues to Kaede, a fluorescent protein that originated in a different scleractinian coral Trachyphyllia geoffroyi, but can also be irreversibly converted from a green to red emitting form using UV light. Excluding residues Phe-61 and His-62, the chromophore environment and chromophore itself are unaffected by photochemical modification. Wild-type EosFP has a tetrameric arrangement of subunits where each subunit has the same β-can structure as GFP. This structure includes an 11-stranded barrel and, down the central axis, the fluorophore-containing helix.

=== Structure of Green EosFP ===
In its anionic form, the green chromophore has an absorption maxima at 506 nm and an emission maxima at 516 nm. It is formed autocatalytically from amino acids His-62, Tyr-63 and Gly-64. Immediately surrounding the chromophore there is a cluster of charged or polar amino acids as well as structural water molecules. Above the plane of the chromophore, there is a network of hydrogen bond interactions between Glu-144, His-194, Glu-212 and Gln-38. Arg-66 and Arg-91 participate in hydrogen bonding with the carbonyl oxygen of green Eos's imidazolinone moiety. The His-62 side chain lies in an unpolar environment. Conversion from the green to red form depends on the presence of a histidine in the first position of the tripeptide HYG that forms the chromophore. When this histidine residue is substituted with M, S, T or L, Eos only emits bright green light and no longer acts as a photoconvertible fluorescent protein.

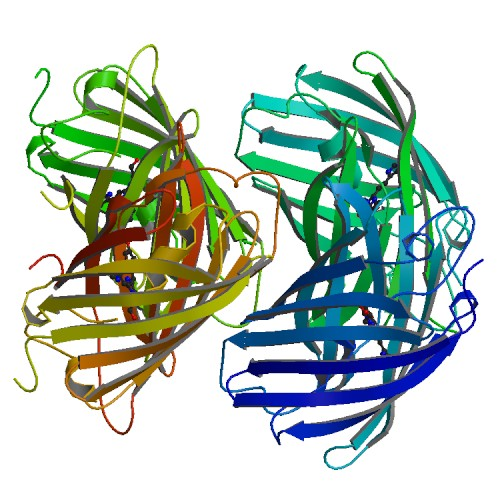
A representation of photofluorescent EosFP in its red form (~581) obtained from the Protein Data Bank (PDB) through X-ray diffraction.

=== Structure of Red EosFP ===
The red chromophore, which is generated by cleavage of the peptide backbone, has an absorption maxima at 571 nm and an emission maxima at 581 nm, in its anionic form. The break in the peptide backbone that leads to this chromophore is between His-62 Nα and Cα. The observed red fluorescence occurs due to an extension of the chromophore's π-conjugation where the His-62 imidazole ring connects to the imidazolinone. The hydrogen bond patterns of the red and green chromophores are almost identical.

Properties
Photoconversion wavelength	390 nm
Green absorbance peak	506 nm
Green emission peak	516 nm
Red absorbance peak	571 nm
Red emission peak	581 nm
Green brightness*	1.3X
Red brightness*	0.7X
*Brightness values are relative to EGFP.

== Photochemical conversion ==
Photochemical conversion occurs due to interactions between the chromophoric unit and residues in its vicinity. Glu-212 functions as a base that removes a proton from His-62 aiding in the cleavage of the His-62-Nα-Cα bond. Replacing Glu-212 with glutamine prevents photoconversion. At low pH, the yield of Eos involved in photoconversion is greatly increased as the fraction of molecules in the protonated form increases. The action spectrum for photoconversion is closely related to the action spectrum for Eos's protonated form. These observations suggest that the neutral form of the green chromophore, including a protonated Tyr-63 side chain, is the gateway structure for photoconversion. Proton ejection from the Tyr-63 phenyl side chain is an important event in the conversion mechanism where a proton is transferred from the His-62 imidazole, which is hydrogen-bonded to the Phe-61 carbonyl. The extra proton causes His-62 to donate a proton to the Phe-61 carbonyl forming a leaving group out of the peptide bond between His and Phe in the elimination reaction. The His-62 side chain is protonated during photoexcitation and assists the reaction by donating a proton to the Phe-61 carbonyl in the leaving group. After the backbone is cleaved, the hydrogen bond between His-62 and Phe-61 is reformed. When His-62 is replaced with other amino acids, EosFP loses its ability to photoconvert, providing evidence that His-62 is a necessary component of the photoconversion mechanism. The internal charge distribution of the green chromophore is altered during photo excitation to assist in the elimination reaction.

== Spectroscopy ==
Both the fluorescence excitation and emission spectrums of wild-type EosFP are shifted ~65 nm to the right upon excitation toward the red end of the spectrum. This spectral change is caused by an extension of the chromophore accompanied by a break in the peptide backbone between Phe-61 and His-62 in an irreversible mechanism. The presence of a crisp isosbestic point at 432 nm also suggests an interconversion between two species. An absorption peak at 280 nm is visible due to aromatic amino acids which transfer their excitation energy to the green chromophore. The quantum yield of the green-emitting form of Eos is 0.7. In the red shifted species, there are pronounced vibronic sidebands separate from the main peak at 533 nm and 629 nm in the excitation spectrum and emission spectrum respectively. There is another peak in the red excitation spectrum at 502 nm likely due to FRET excitation of the red fluorophore. The quantum yield of the red-emitting form is 0.55.

EosFPs variants show almost no difference in spectroscopic properties, therefore, it is likely that the structural modifications which arise from separation of interfaces have little to no effect on the structure of the fluorophore-binding site.

== Applications ==
=== Tracking of Fusion Proteins ===
Many different fusion proteins have been created using EosFP and its engineered variants. These fusion proteins allow for the tracking of proteins within living cells while retaining complex biological functions like protein-protein interactions and protein-DNA interactions. Eos fusion constructs include those with recombination signal-binding protein (RBP) and cytokeratin. Studies have shown that it is favourable to attach the protein of interest to the N-terminal side of the EosFP label. These fusion constructs have been used to visualize nuclear translocation with androgen receptors, dynamics of the cytoskeleton with actin and vinculin and intranuclear protein movement with RBP.

=== Multicolour Labelling ===
Since EosFP can be used in fusion constructs while maintaining functionality of the protein of interest, it is a popular choice for multi-colour labelling studies. In a dual-colour labelling experiment to map the stages of mitosis, HEK293 cells were first stably transfected with tubulin-binding protein cDNA fused to EGFP for visualization of the spindle apparatus. Then, transient transfection of recombination signal-binding protein (RBP) fused to d2EosFP was used to visualize the beginning of mitosis. Photoconversion was completed by fluorescent microscopy and highlighted the separation between two sets of chromosomes during anaphase, telophase and cytokinesis.

=== Tracking of Cell Movement in Developmental Biology ===
EosFP has been used to track cell movements during embryonic development of Xenopus laevis. At the two-cell/ early gastrula stage, capped mRNA coding for a dimeric EosFP (d2EosFP) was injected into cells and locally photoconverted using fluorescence microscopy. These fluorescent embryos demonstrated the dynamics of cell movement during neurulation. EosFP was found in part of the notochord which shows the possibility of EosFP to be used in fate-mapping experiments.

== Engineered variants ==
=== mEos4 ===
Many new monomeric versions of EosFP have been developed that offer advantages over wild type EosFP. Developed by a team at the Janelia Farm Research Campus at Howard Hughes Medical Institute, mEos4 has higher photostability and longer imaging abilities than EosFP. It is also highly resistant to chemical fixatives such as PFA, glutaraldehyde and OsO_{4} which are used to preserve samples. mEos4 is effective at higher temperatures than EosFP, phot-converts at an increased rate and has a higher emission amplitude in both green and red fluorescent states. Applications for the mEos4 protein include photoactivation localization microscopy (PALM), correlative light/ electron microscopy (CLEM), protein activity indication and activity integration (post-hoc imaging for protein activity over time).

=== mEos2 ===
mEosFP is another monomeric Eos variant that folds effectively at 37 degrees Celsius. Where tdEos (tandem dimer) cannot fuse to targets such as histones, tubulin, intermediate filaments and gap junctions, and mEos (monomeric) which can only be used successfully at 30 degrees Celsius, mEos2 is an engineered variant that can fold effectively at 37 degrees Celsius and successfully label targets intolerant to fusion from other fluorescent protein dimers . mEos2 shows almost identical spectral properties, brightness, pKa, photoconversion, contrast and maturation properties to WT Eos. The localization precision of mEos2 is twice as great as other monomeric fluorescent proteins.

=== CaMPARI ===
Also at the Janelia Research Campus, a new fluorescent molecules known as CaMPARI (calcium-modulated photoactivatable ratiometric integrator) was developed using EosFP. The permanent green to red conversion signal was coupled with a calcium-sensitive protein, calmodulin, so that color change in the fusion construct depended on the release of calcium accompanied by neural activity. CaMPARI is able to permanently mark neurons that are active at an any time and can also be targeted to synapses. This visualization is possible across a wide amount of brain tissue as opposed to the limited view available with using a microscope. It also allows for the visualization of neural activity during complicated behaviors as the organism under study is allowed to move freely, rather than under a microscope. It also allows for the observation of neurons during specific behavior periods. CaMPARI has, thus far, been used to label active neural circuits in mice, zebrafish and fruit flies.
