= Green fluorescent protein =

Protein that exhibits bright green fluorescence when exposed to ultraviolet light

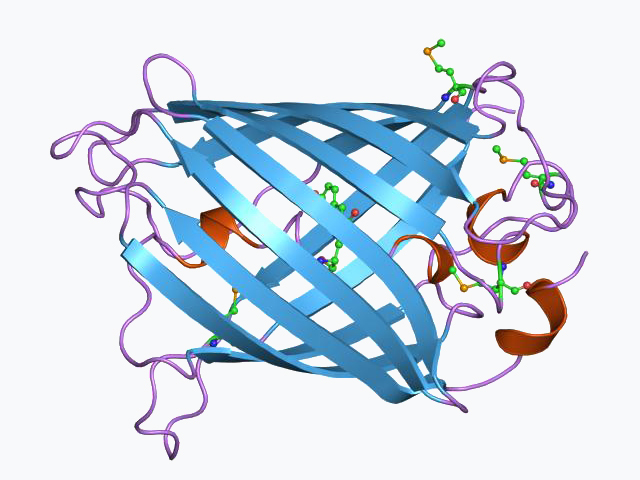
- Structure of the Aequorea victoria green fluorescent protein.

Identifiers
- Symbol: GFP
- Pfam: PF01353
- Pfam clan: CL0069
- InterPro: IPR011584
- CATH: 1ema
- SCOP2: 1ema / SCOPe / SUPFAM
Available protein structures:
- PDB: IPR011584 PF01353 (ECOD; PDBsum)
- AlphaFold: IPR011584; PF01353

Green fluorescent protein

Identifiers
- Organism: Aequorea victoria
- Symbol: GFP
- Orthologs: OMA: entry
- UniProt: P42212
Search for
- Structures: Swiss-model
- Domains: InterPro

The green fluorescent protein (GFP) is a protein that exhibits green fluorescence when exposed to light in the blue to ultraviolet range. The label GFP traditionally refers to the protein first isolated from the jellyfish Aequorea victoria and is sometimes called avGFP. However, GFPs have been found in other organisms including corals, sea anemones, zoanithids, copepods and lancelets.

The GFP from A. victoria has a major excitation peak at a wavelength of 395 nm and a minor one at 475 nm. Its emission peak is at 509 nm, which is in the lower green portion of the visible spectrum. The fluorescence quantum yield (QY) of GFP is 0.79. The GFP from the sea pansy (Renilla reniformis) has a single major excitation peak at 498 nm. GFP makes for an excellent tool in many forms of biology due to its ability to form an internal chromophore without requiring any accessory cofactors, gene products, or enzymes / substrates other than molecular oxygen.

In cell and molecular biology, the GFP gene is frequently used as a reporter of expression. It has been used in modified forms to make biosensors, and many animals have been created that express GFP, which demonstrates a proof of concept that a gene can be expressed throughout a given organism, in selected organs, or in cells of interest. GFP can be introduced into animals or other species through transgenic techniques, and maintained in their genome and that of their offspring. GFP has been expressed in many species, including bacteria, yeasts, fungi, fish and mammals, including in human cells. Scientists Roger Y. Tsien, Osamu Shimomura, and Martin Chalfie were awarded the 2008 Nobel Prize in Chemistry on 10 October 2008 for their discovery and development of the green fluorescent protein.

Most commercially available genes for GFP and similar fluorescent proteins are around 730 base-pairs long. The natural protein has 238 amino acids. Its molecular mass is 27 kD. Therefore, fusing the GFP gene to the gene of a protein of interest can significantly increase the protein's size and molecular mass, and can impair the protein's natural function or change its location or trajectory of transport within the cell.

== Background ==
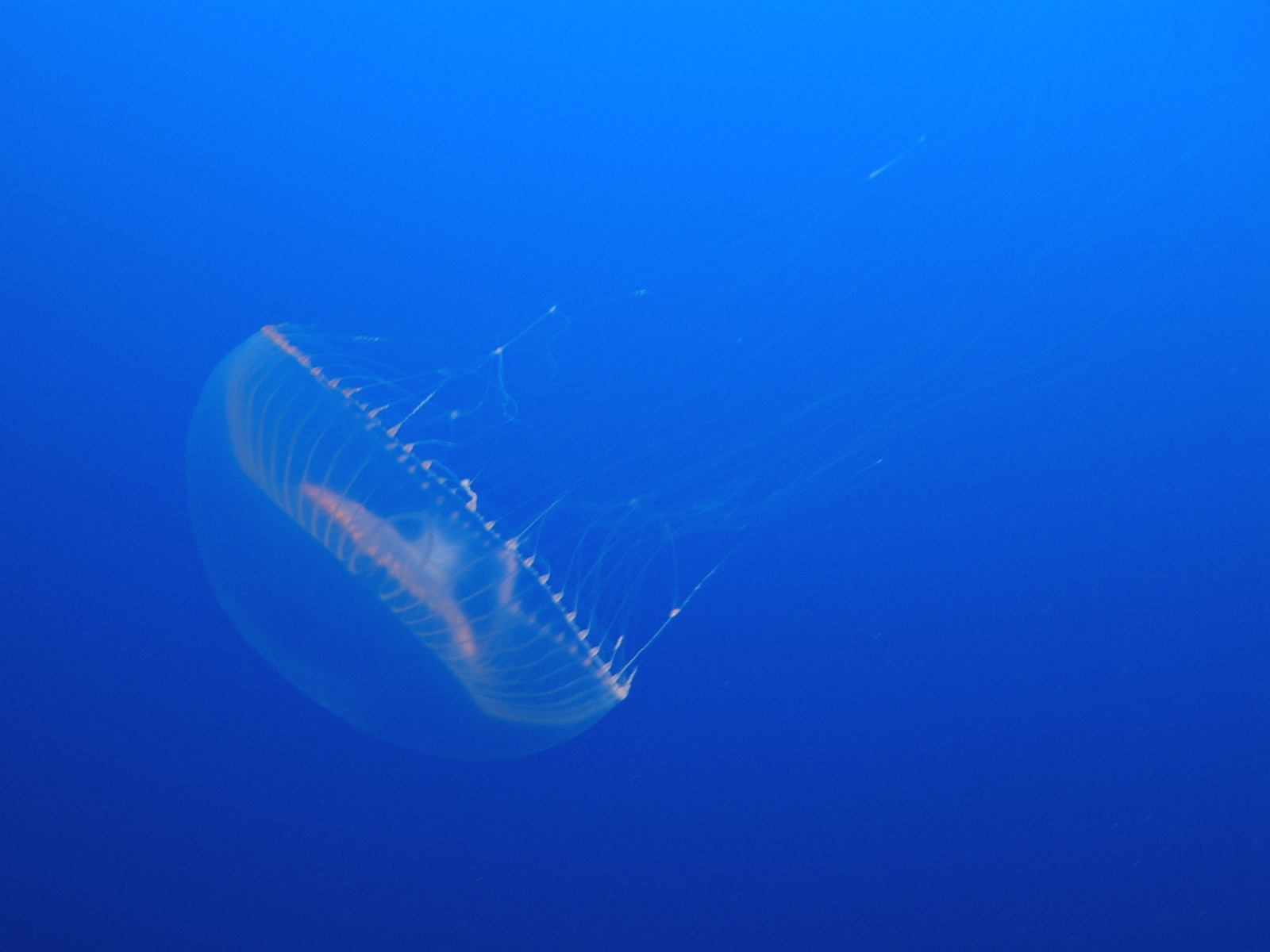
Aequorea victoria

3D reconstruction of confocal image of VEGF-overexpressing neural progenitors (red) and GFP-positive control neural progenitor cells (green) in the rat olfactory bulb. RECA-1-positive blood vessels - blue color.

=== Wild-type GFP (wtGFP) ===
In the 1960s and 1970s, GFP, along with the separate luminescent protein aequorin (an enzyme that catalyzes the breakdown of luciferin, releasing light), was first purified from the jellyfish Aequorea victoria and its properties studied by Osamu Shimomura. In A. victoria, GFP fluorescence occurs when aequorin interacts with Ca^{2+} ions, inducing a blue glow. Some of this luminescent energy is transferred to the GFP, shifting the overall color towards green. However, its utility as a tool for molecular biologists did not begin to be realized until 1992 when Douglas Prasher reported the cloning and nucleotide sequence of wtGFP in Gene. The funding for this project had run out, so Prasher sent cDNA samples to several labs. The lab of Martin Chalfie expressed the coding sequence of wtGFP, with the first few amino acids deleted, in heterologous cells of E. coli and C. elegans, publishing the results in Science in 1994. Frederick Tsuji's lab independently reported the expression of the recombinant protein one month later. Remarkably, the GFP molecule folded and was fluorescent at room temperature, without the need for exogenous cofactors specific to the jellyfish. Although this near-wtGFP was fluorescent, it had several drawbacks, including dual peaked excitation spectra, pH sensitivity, chloride sensitivity, poor fluorescence quantum yield, poor photostability and poor folding at 37 °C (99 °F).

The first reported crystal structure of a GFP was that of the S65T mutant by the Remington group in Science in 1996. One month later, the Phillips group independently reported the wild-type GFP structure in Nature Biotechnology. These crystal structures provided vital background on chromophore formation and neighboring residue interactions. Researchers have modified these residues by directed and random mutagenesis to produce the wide variety of GFP derivatives in use since then. Further research into GFP has shown that it is resistant to detergents, proteases, guanidinium chloride (GdmCl) treatments, and drastic temperature changes.

=== GFP derivatives ===
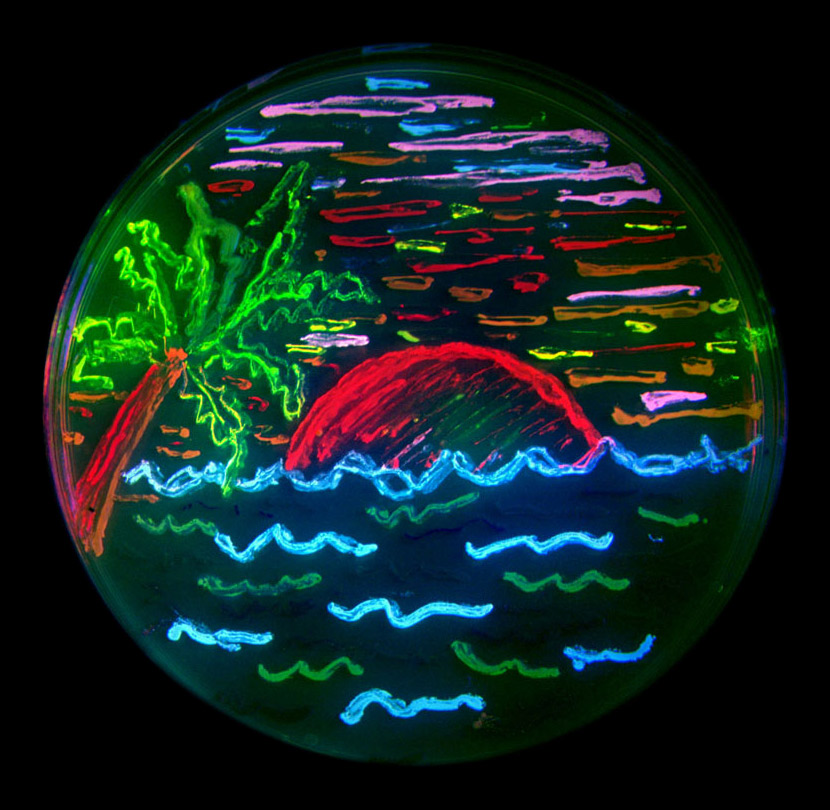
The diversity of genetic mutations is illustrated by this San Diego beach scene drawn with living bacteria expressing 8 different colors of fluorescent proteins (derived from GFP and dsRed).

Due to the potential for widespread usage and the evolving needs of researchers, many different mutants of GFP have been engineered. The first major improvement was a single point mutation (S65T) reported in 1995 in Nature by Roger Tsien. This mutation dramatically improved the spectral characteristics of GFP, resulting in increased fluorescence, photostability, and a shift of the major excitation peak to 488 nm, with the peak emission kept at 509 nm. This matched the spectral characteristics of commonly available FITC filter sets, increasing the practicality of use by the general researcher. A 37 °C folding efficiency (F64L) point mutant to this scaffold, yielding enhanced GFP (EGFP), was discovered in 1995 by the laboratories of Thastrup and Falkow. EGFP allowed the practical use of GFPs in mammalian cells. EGFP has an extinction coefficient (denoted ε) of 55,000 M^{−1}cm^{−1}. The fluorescence quantum yield (QY) of EGFP is 0.60. The relative brightness, expressed as ε•QY, is 33,000 M^{−1}cm^{−1}. The widely used EGFP sequence, however, may produce an unintended protein product, using the +2 frame as the template.

Superfolder GFP (sfGFP), a series of mutations that allow GFP to rapidly fold and mature even when fused to poorly folding peptides, was reported in 2006.

Many other mutations have been made, including color mutants; in particular, blue fluorescent protein (EBFP, EBFP2, Azurite, mKalama1), cyan fluorescent protein (ECFP, Cerulean, CyPet, mTurquoise2), and yellow fluorescent protein derivatives (YFP, Citrine, Venus, YPet). BFP derivatives (except mKalama1) contain the Y66H substitution. They exhibit a broad absorption band in the ultraviolet centered close to 380 nanometers and an emission maximum at 448 nanometers. A green fluorescent protein mutant (BFPms1) that preferentially binds Zn(II) and Cu(II) has been developed. BFPms1 have several important mutations including and the BFP chromophore (Y66H),Y145F for higher quantum yield, H148G for creating a hole into the beta-barrel and several other mutations that increase solubility. Zn(II) binding increases fluorescence intensity, while Cu(II) binding quenches fluorescence and shifts the absorbance maximum from 379 to 444 nm. Therefore, they can be used as a Zn biosensor.

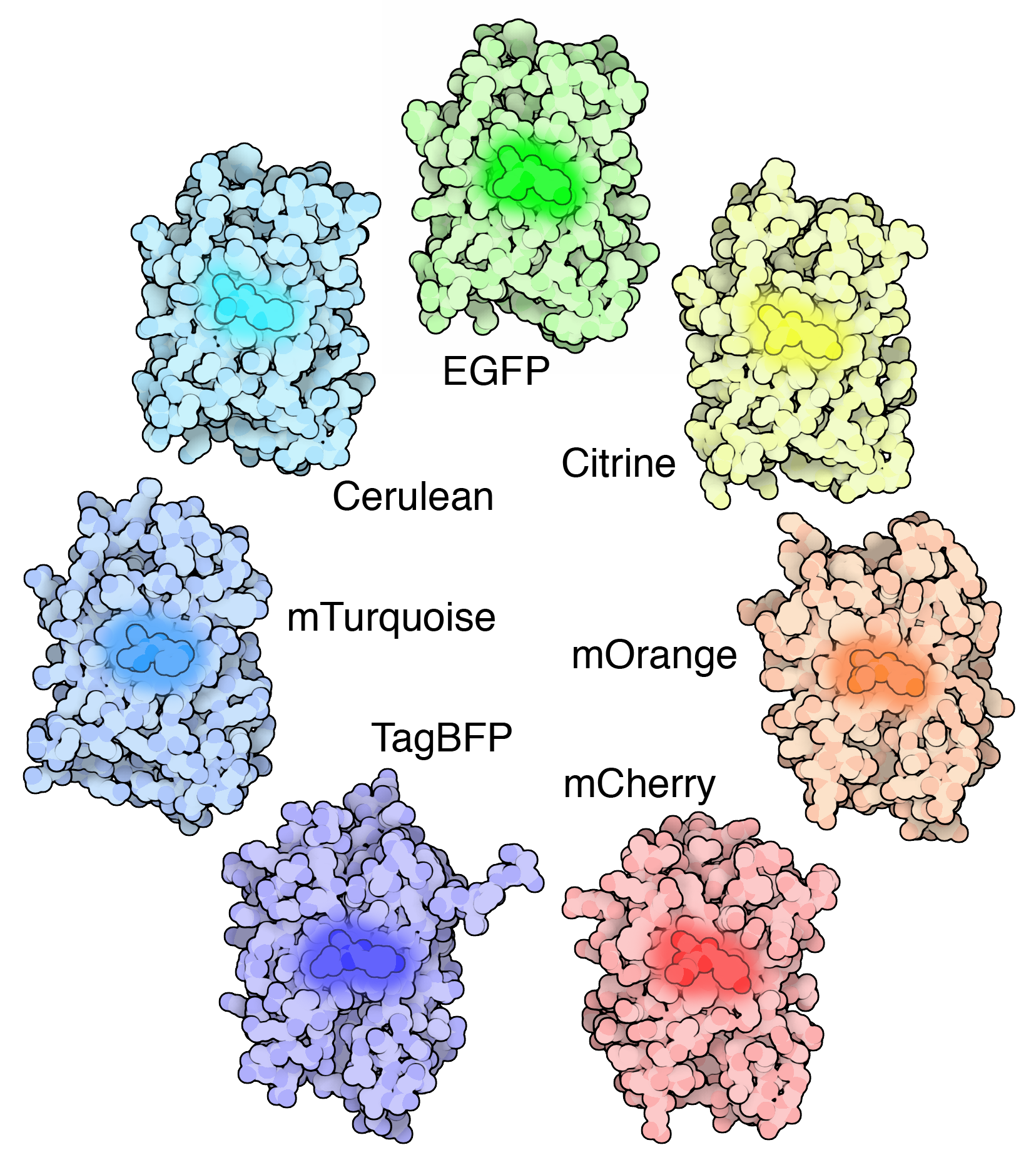
A palette of variants of GFP and DsRed.

More color variants are possible via chromophore binding. The critical mutation in cyan derivatives is the Y66W substitution, which causes the chromophore to form with an indole rather than phenol component. Several additional compensatory mutations in the surrounding barrel are required to restore brightness to this modified chromophore due to the increased bulk of the indole group. In ECFP and Cerulean, the N-terminal half of the seventh strand exhibits two conformations. These conformations both have a complex set of van der Waals interactions with the chromophore. The Y145A and H148D mutations in Cerulean stabilize these interactions and allow the chromophore to be more planar, better packed, and less prone to collisional quenching.

Additional site-directed random mutagenesis in combination with fluorescence lifetime based screening has further stabilized the seventh β-strand resulting in a bright variant, mTurquoise2, with a quantum yield (QY) of 0.93. The red-shifted wavelength of the YFP derivatives is accomplished by the T203Y mutation and is due to π-electron stacking interactions between the substituted tyrosine residue and the chromophore. These two classes of spectral variants are often employed for Förster resonance energy transfer (FRET) experiments. Genetically encoded FRET reporters sensitive to cell signaling molecules, such as calcium or glutamate, protein phosphorylation state, protein complementation, receptor dimerization, and other processes provide highly specific optical readouts of cell activity in real time.

Semirational mutagenesis of a number of residues led to pH-sensitive mutants known as pHluorins, and later super-ecliptic pHluorins. By exploiting the rapid change in pH upon synaptic vesicle fusion, pHluorins tagged to synaptobrevin have been used to visualize synaptic activity in neurons.

Redox sensitive GFP (roGFP) was engineered by introduction of cysteines into the beta barrel structure. The redox state of the cysteines determines the fluorescent properties of roGFP.

=== Nomenclature ===
The nomenclature of modified GFPs is often confusing due to overlapping mapping of several GFP versions onto a single name. For example, mGFP often refers to a GFP with an N-terminal palmitoylation that causes the GFP to bind to cell membranes. However, the same term is also used to refer to monomeric GFP, which is often achieved by the dimer interface breaking A206K mutation. Wild-type GFP has a weak dimerization tendency at concentrations above 5 mg/mL. mGFP also stands for "modified GFP", which has been optimized through amino acid exchange for stable expression in plant cells.

== In nature ==
Live lancelet (B. floridae) under a fluorescent microscope.

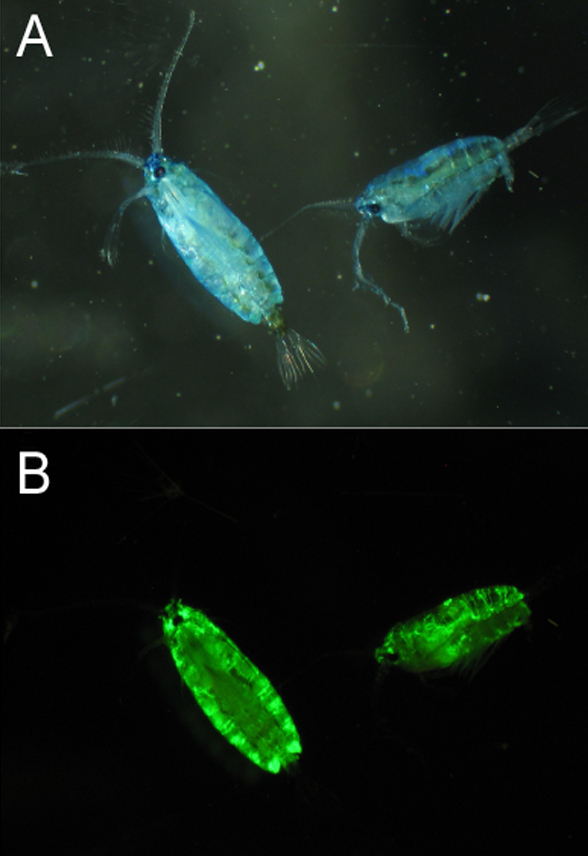
In the marine copepod Pontella mimocerami

The purpose of both the (primary) bioluminescence (from aequorin's action on luciferin) and the (secondary) fluorescence of GFP in jellyfish is unknown. GFP is co-expressed with aequorin in small granules around the rim of the jellyfish bell. The secondary excitation peak (480 nm) of GFP does absorb some of the blue emission of aequorin, giving the bioluminescence a more green hue. The serine 65 residue of the GFP chromophore is responsible for the dual-peaked excitation spectra of wild-type GFP. It is conserved in all three GFP isoforms originally cloned by Prasher. Nearly all mutations of this residue consolidate the excitation spectra to a single peak at either 395 nm or 480 nm. The precise mechanism of this sensitivity is complex, but, it seems, involves donation of a hydrogen from serine 65 to glutamate 222, which influences chromophore ionization. Since a single mutation can dramatically enhance the 480 nm excitation peak, making GFP a much more efficient partner of aequorin, A. victoria appears to evolutionarily prefer the less-efficient, dual-peaked excitation spectrum. Roger Tsien has speculated that varying hydrostatic pressure with depth may affect serine 65's ability to donate a hydrogen to the chromophore and shift the ratio of the two excitation peaks. Thus, the jellyfish may change the color of its bioluminescence with depth. However, a collapse in the population of jellyfish in Friday Harbor, where GFP was originally discovered, has hampered further study of the role of GFP in the jellyfish's natural environment.

Most species of lancelet are known to produce GFP in various regions of their body. Unlike A. victoria, lancelets do not produce their own blue light, and the origin of their endogenous GFP is still unknown. Some speculate that it attracts plankton towards the mouth of the lancelet, serving as a passive hunting mechanism. It may also serve as a photoprotective agent in the larvae, preventing damage caused by high-intensity blue light by converting it into lower-intensity green light. However, these theories have not been tested.

GFP-like proteins have been found in multiple species of marine copepods, particularly from the Pontellidae and Aetideidae families. GFP isolated from Pontella mimocerami has shown high levels of brightness with a quantum yield of 0.92, making them nearly two-fold brighter than the commonly used EGFP isolated from A. victoria.

== Other fluorescent proteins ==
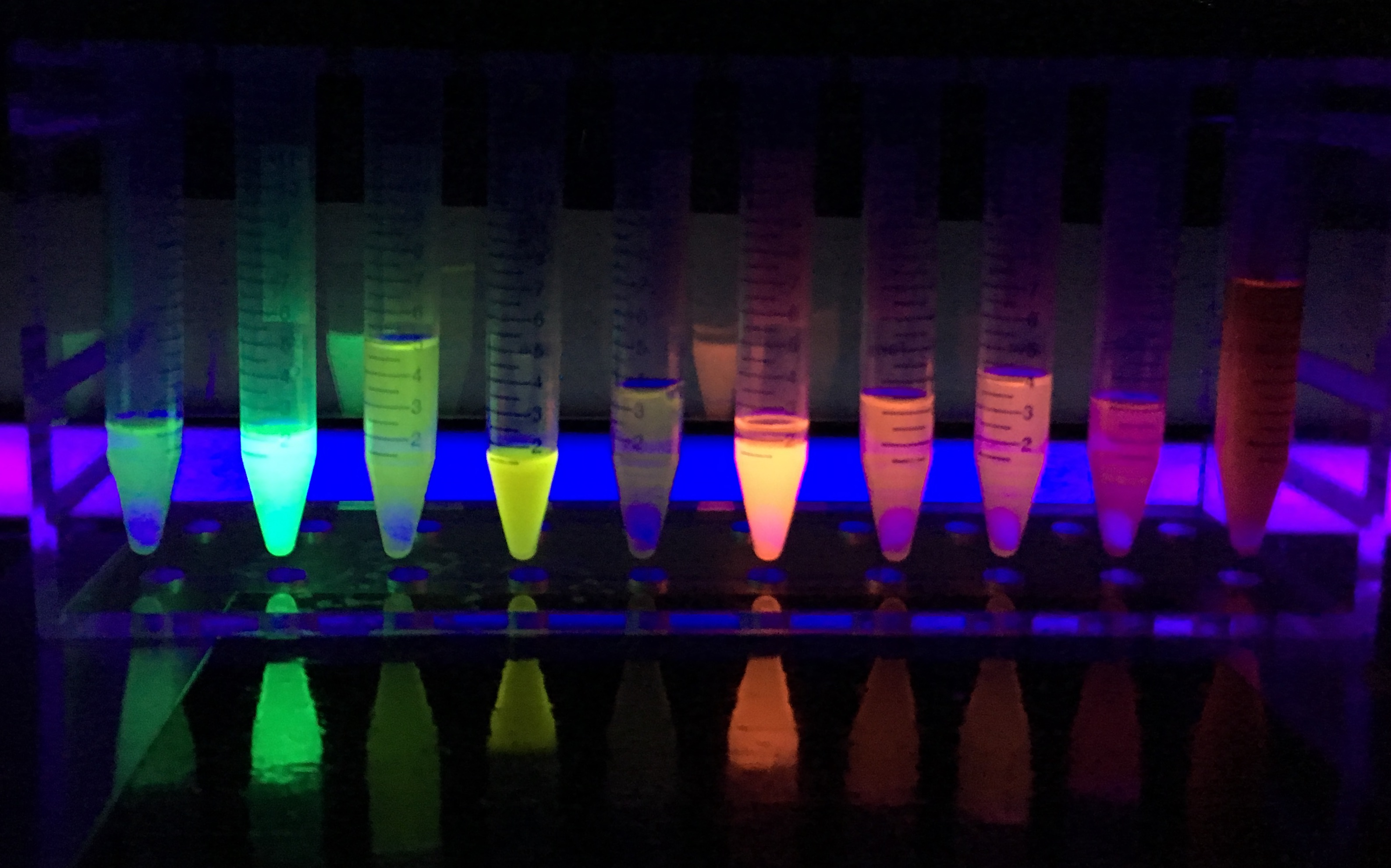
Different proteins produce different fluorescent colors when exposed to ultraviolet light.

There are many GFP-like proteins that, despite being in the same protein family as GFP, are not directly derived from Aequorea victoria. These include dsRed, eqFP611, Dronpa, TagRFPs, KFP, EosFP/IrisFP, Dendra, and so on. Having been developed from proteins in different organisms, these proteins can sometimes display unanticipated approaches to chromophore formation. Some of these, such as KFP, are developed from naturally non- or weakly-fluorescent proteins to be greatly improved upon by mutagenesis. When GFP-like barrels of different spectral characteristics are used, the excitation spectrum of one chromophore can be used to power another chromophore (FRET), allowing for conversion between wavelengths of light.

FMN-binding fluorescent proteins (FbFPs) were developed in 2007 and are a class of small (11–16 kDa), oxygen-independent fluorescent proteins that are derived from blue-light receptors. They are intended especially for the use under anaerobic or hypoxic conditions, since the formation and binding of the flavin chromophore does not require molecular oxygen, as it is the case with the synthesis of the GFP chromophore.

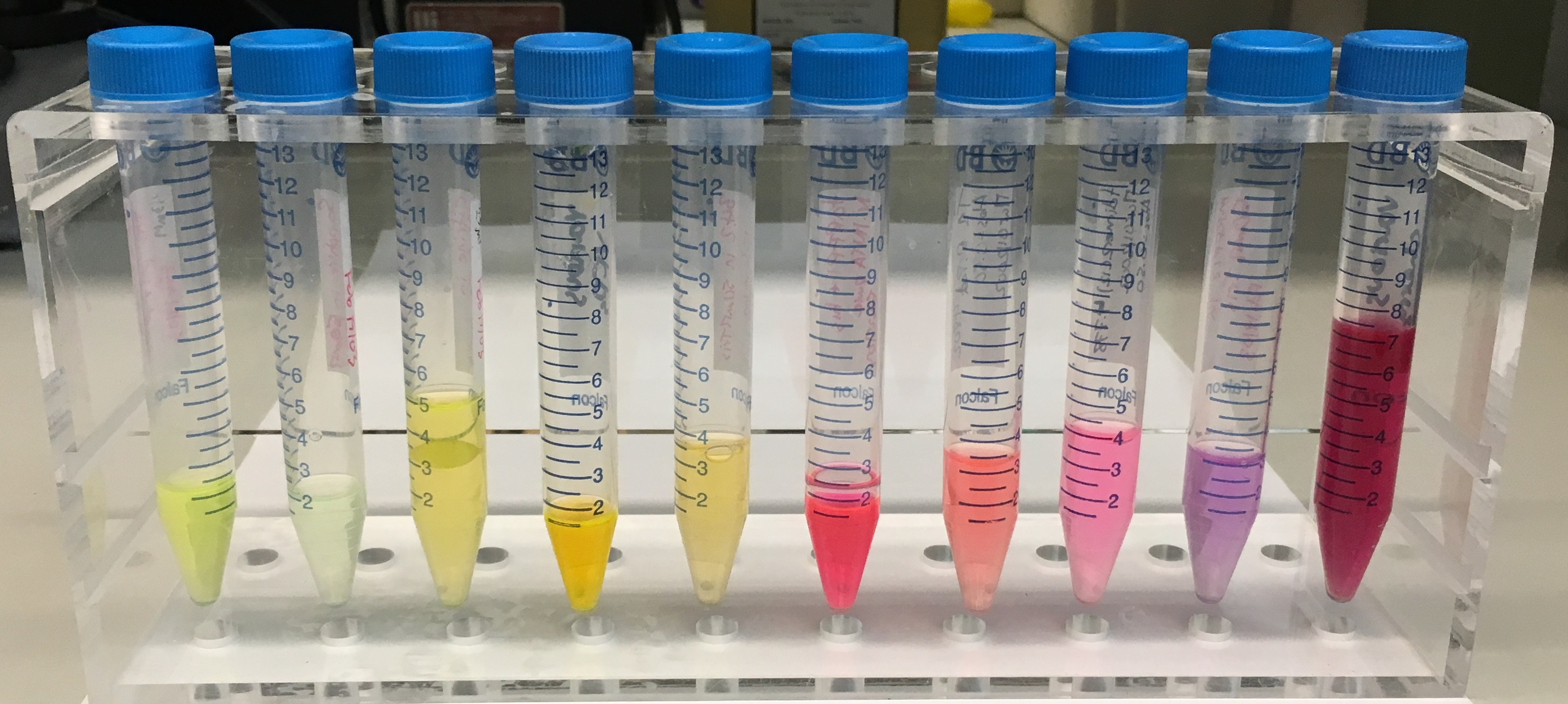
White light image, or image seen by the eye, of fluorescent proteins in image above.

Fluorescent proteins with other chromophores, such as UnaG with bilirubin, can display unique properties like red-shifted emission above 600 nm or photoconversion from a green-emitting state to a red-emitting state. They can have excitation and emission wavelengths far enough apart to achieve conversion between red and green light.

A new class of fluorescent protein was engineered from α-allophycocyanin, a phycobiliprotein found in the cyanobacterium Trichodesmium erythraeum, and was named small ultra red fluorescent protein (smURFP) in 2016. smURFP autocatalytically incorporates the chromophore biliverdin without the need for an external protein known as a lyase. Jellyfish- and coral-derived GFP-like proteins require oxygen and produce a stoichiometric amount of hydrogen peroxide upon chromophore formation. smURFP does not require oxygen or produce hydrogen peroxide. smURFP has a large extinction coefficient (180,000 M^{−1} cm^{−1}) and has a modest quantum yield (0.20), which makes it comparable biophysical brightness to eGFP and ~2-fold brighter than most red or far-red fluorescent proteins derived from coral. smURFP spectral properties are similar to the organic dye Cy5.

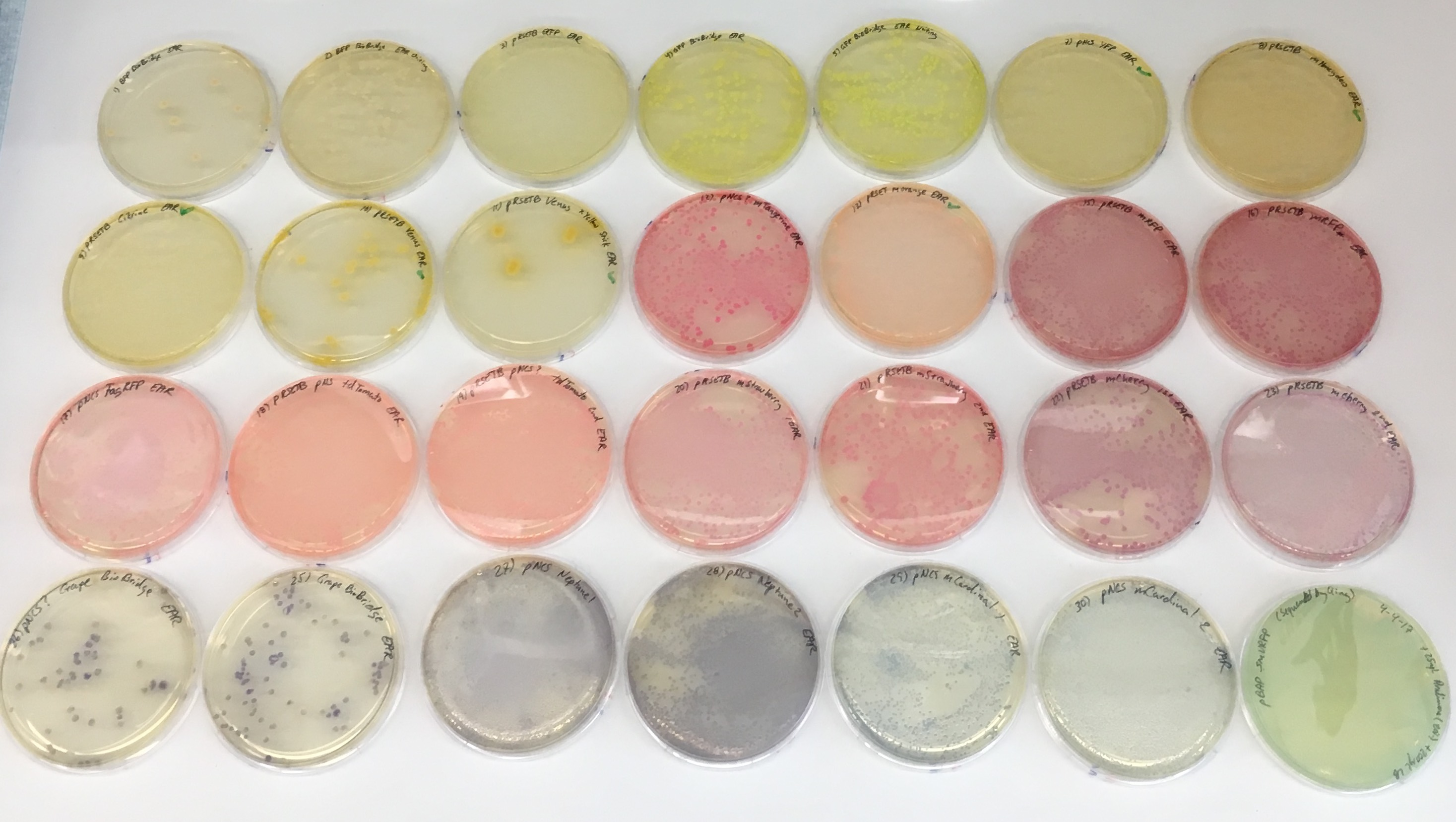
E. coli colonies expressing fluorescent proteins.

Reviews on new classes of fluorescent proteins and applications can be found in the cited reviews.

== Structure ==
GFP has a beta barrel structure consisting of eleven β-strands with a pleated sheet arrangement, with an alpha helix containing the covalently bonded chromophore 4-(p-hydroxybenzylidene)imidazolidin-5-one (HBI) running through the center. Five shorter alpha helices form caps on the ends of the structure. The beta barrel structure is a nearly perfect cylinder, 42Å long and 24Å in diameter (some studies have reported a diameter of 30Å), creating what is referred to as a "β-can" formation, which is unique to the GFP-like family. HBI, the spontaneously modified form of the tripeptide Ser65–Tyr66–Gly67, is nonfluorescent in the absence of the properly folded GFP scaffold and exists mainly in the un-ionized phenol form in wtGFP. Inward-facing sidechains of the barrel induce specific cyclization reactions in Ser65–Tyr66–Gly67 that induce ionization of HBI to the phenolate form and chromophore formation. This process of post-translational modification is referred to as maturation. The hydrogen-bonding network and electron-stacking interactions with these sidechains influence the color, intensity and photostability of GFP and its numerous derivatives. The tightly packed nature of the barrel excludes solvent molecules, protecting the chromophore fluorescence from quenching by water. In addition to the auto-cyclization of the Ser65-Tyr66-Gly67, a 1,2-dehydrogenation reaction occurs at the Tyr66 residue. Besides the three residues that form the chromophore, residues such as Gln94, Arg96, His148, Thr203, and Glu222 all act as stabilizers. The residues of Gln94, Arg96, and His148 are able to stabilize by delocalizing the chromophore charge. Arg96 is the most important stabilizing residue due to the fact that it prompts the necessary structural realignments that are necessary from the HBI ring to occur. Any mutation to the Arg96 residue would result in a decrease in the development rate of the chromophore because proper electrostatic and steric interactions would be lost. Tyr66 is the recipient of hydrogen bonds and does not ionize in order to produce favorable electrostatics.

GFP Movie showing entire structure and zoom in to fluorescent chromophore.

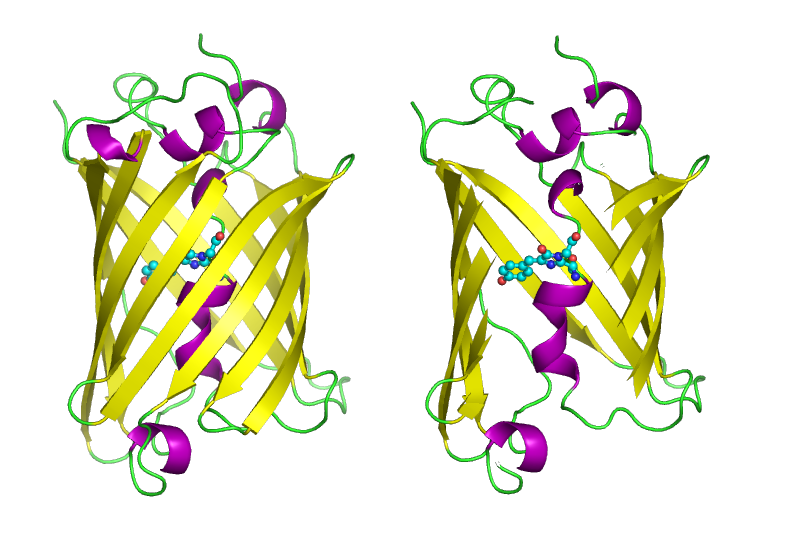
GFP molecules drawn in cartoon style, one fully and one with the side of the beta barrel cut away to reveal the chromophore (highlighted as ball-and-stick). From PDB: 1GFL.

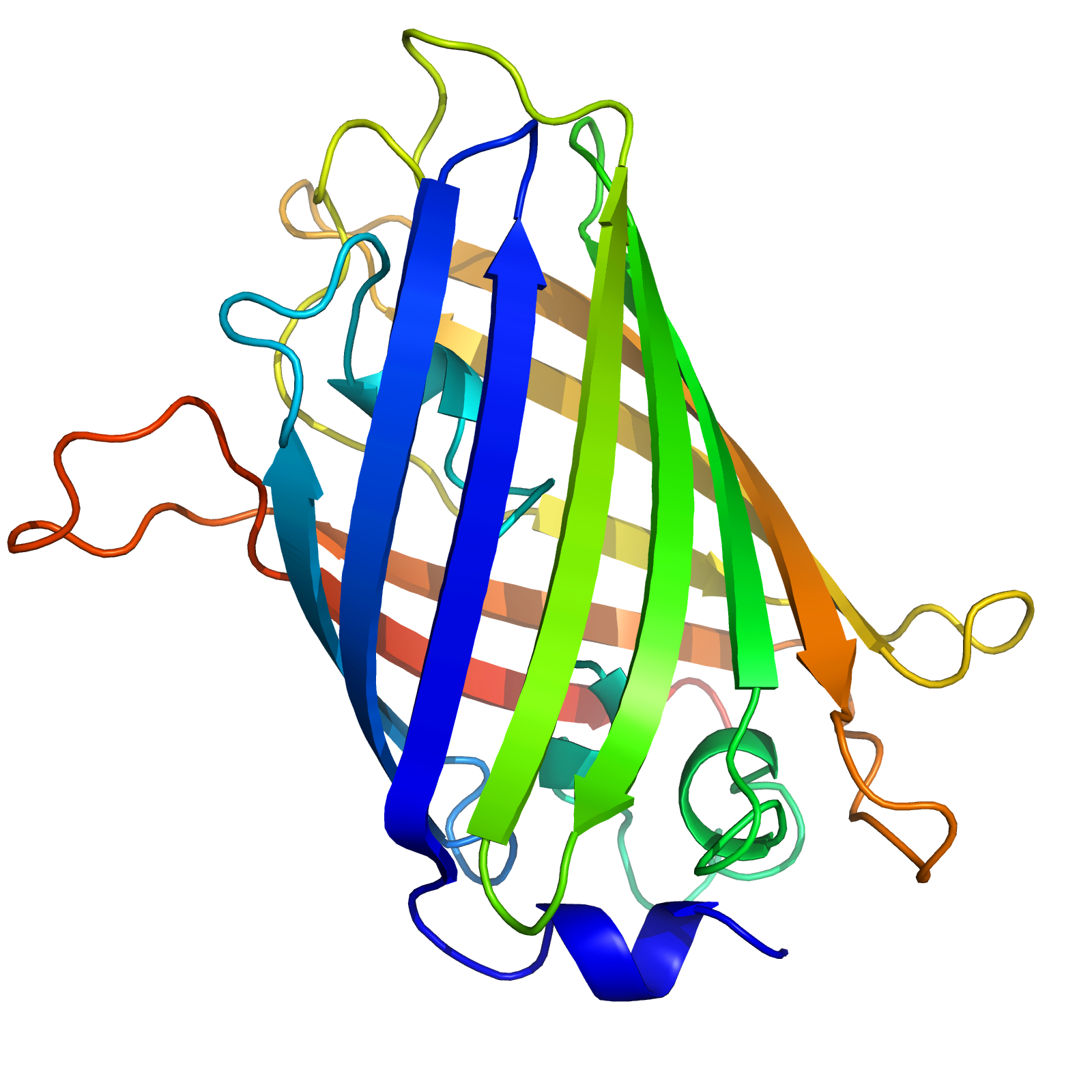
GFP ribbon diagram. From PDB: 1EMA.

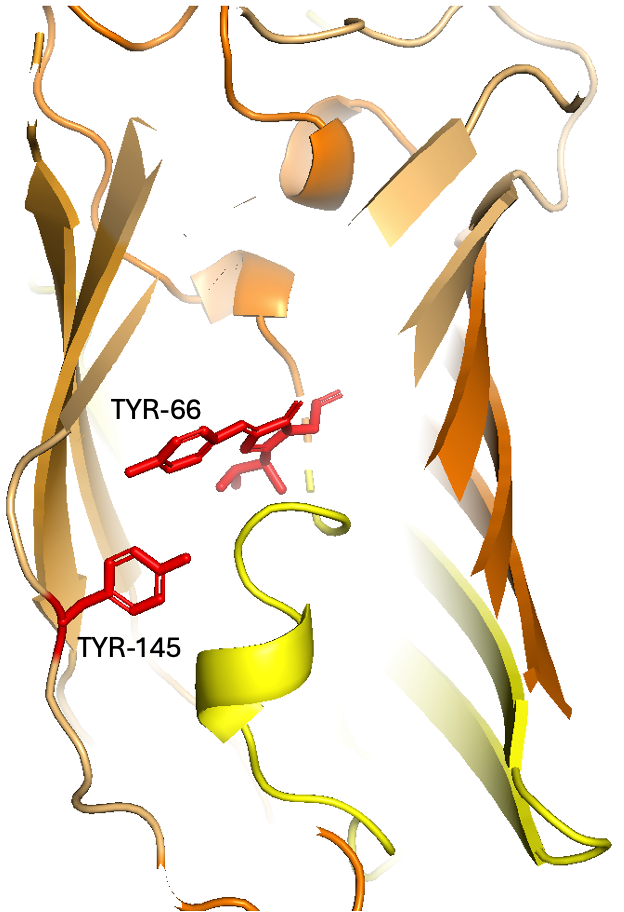
Structure of GFP with PDB code 1EMA. The two tyrosine residues that undergo substitution mutations at positions 66 and 145 are highlighted in red. These two tyrosines at position 66 and 145 need to be substituted with histidine and phenylalanine, respectively for this protein to fluoresce blue.

Blue fluorescent protein (BFP) is the blue variant of green fluorescent protein (GFP). BFP has a very similar structure to GFP. In the BFP structure, two substitution mutations in the amino acid sequence change its fluorescence from green to blue. The first mutation occurs inside the chromophore of GFP at position 66 which changes a tyrosine to a histidine. The other mutation in BFP is on the tyrosine at position 145 which mutates to phenylalanine. The autocatalytic cyclization and oxidation of the serine, tyrosine, and glycine form the GFP chromophore. These three residues at positions 65-67 make up the green fluorescent chromophore. When the tyrosine in the chromophore is substituted by a histidine, it changes the folding structure of the protein and emission spectra. The T145F mutation is also added to increase the stability of the protein and well as intensify the fluorescence. These mutations are what change GFP to BFP.

=== Autocatalytic formation of the chromophore in wtGFP ===

Mechanistically, the process involves base-mediated cyclization followed by dehydration and oxidation. In the reaction of 7a to 8 involves the formation of an enamine from the imine, while in the reaction of 7b to 9 a proton is abstracted. The formed HBI fluorophore is highlighted in green.

The reactions are catalyzed by residues Glu222 and Arg96. An analogous mechanism is also possible with threonine in place of Ser65.

== Applications ==
=== Reporter assays ===
Green fluorescent protein may be used as a reporter gene.

For example, GFP can be used as a reporter for environmental toxicity levels. This protein has been shown to be an effective way to measure the toxicity levels of various chemicals including ethanol, p-formaldehyde, phenol, triclosan, and paraben. GFP is great as a reporter protein because it has no effect on the host when introduced to the host's cellular environment. Due to this ability, no external visualization stain, ATP, or cofactors are needed. With regards to pollutant levels, the fluorescence was measured in order to gauge the effect that the pollutants have on the host cell. The cellular density of the host cell was also measured. Results from the study conducted by Song, Kim, & Seo (2016) showed that there was a decrease in both fluorescence and cellular density as pollutant levels increased. This was indicative of the fact that cellular activity had decreased. More research into this specific application in order to determine the mechanism by which GFP acts as a pollutant marker. Similar results have been observed in zebrafish because zebrafish that were injected with GFP were approximately twenty times more susceptible to recognize cellular stresses than zebrafish that were not injected with GFP.

==== Advantages ====
The biggest advantage of GFP is that it can be heritable, depending on how it was introduced, allowing for continued study of cells and tissues it is expressed in. Visualizing GFP is noninvasive, requiring only illumination with blue light. GFP alone does not interfere with biological processes, but when fused to proteins of interest, careful design of linkers is required to maintain the function of the protein of interest. Moreover, if used with a monomer it is able to diffuse readily throughout cells.

=== Fluorescence microscopy ===
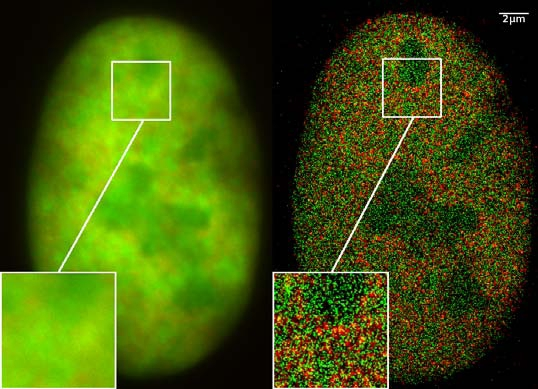
Superresolution with two fusion proteins (GFP-Snf2H and RFP-H2A), Co-localisation studies (2CLM) in the nucleus of a bone cancer cell. 120.000 localized molecules in a widefield area (470 μm^{2}).

The availability of GFP and its derivatives has thoroughly redefined fluorescence microscopy and the way it is used in cell biology and other biological disciplines. While most small fluorescent molecules such as FITC (fluorescein isothiocyanate) are strongly phototoxic when used in live cells, fluorescent proteins such as GFP are usually much less harmful when illuminated in living cells. This has triggered the development of highly automated live-cell fluorescence microscopy systems, which can be used to observe cells over time expressing one or more proteins tagged with fluorescent proteins.

There are many techniques to utilize GFP in a live cell imaging experiment. The most direct way of utilizing GFP is to directly attach it to a protein of interest. For example, GFP can be included in a plasmid expressing other genes to indicate a successful transfection of a gene of interest. Another method is to use a GFP that contains a mutation where the fluorescence will change from green to yellow over time, which is referred to as a fluorescent timer. With the fluorescent timer, researchers can study the state of protein production such as recently activated, continuously activated, or recently deactivated based on the color reported by the fluorescent protein. In yet another example, scientists have modified GFP to become active only after exposure to irradiation giving researchers a tool to selectively activate certain portions of a cell and observe where proteins tagged with the GFP move from the starting location. These are only two examples in a burgeoning field of fluorescent microcopy and a more complete review of biosensors utilizing GFP and other fluorescent proteins can be found here

For example, GFP had been widely used in labelling the spermatozoa of various organisms for identification purposes as in Drosophila melanogaster, where expression of GFP can be used as a marker for a particular characteristic. GFP can also be expressed in different structures enabling morphological distinction. In such cases, the gene for the production of GFP is incorporated into the genome of the organism in the region of the DNA that codes for the target proteins and that is controlled by the same regulatory sequence; that is, the gene's regulatory sequence now controls the production of GFP, in addition to the tagged protein(s). In cells where the gene is expressed, and the tagged proteins are produced, GFP is produced at the same time. Thus, only those cells in which the tagged gene is expressed, or the target proteins are produced, will fluoresce when observed under fluorescence microscopy. Analysis of such time lapse movies has redefined the understanding of many biological processes including protein folding, protein transport, and RNA dynamics, which in the past had been studied using fixed (i.e., dead) material. Obtained data are also used to calibrate mathematical models of intracellular systems and to estimate rates of gene expression. Similarly, GFP can be used as an indicator of protein expression in heterologous systems. In this scenario, fusion proteins containing GFP are introduced indirectly, using RNA of the construct, or directly, with the tagged protein itself. This method is useful for studying structural and functional characteristics of the tagged protein on a macromolecular or single-molecule scale with fluorescence microscopy.

The Vertico SMI microscope using the SPDM Phymod technology uses the so-called "reversible photobleaching" effect of fluorescent dyes like GFP and its derivatives to localize them as single molecules in an optical resolution of 10 nm. This can also be performed as a co-localization of two GFP derivatives (2CLM).

Another powerful use of GFP is to express the protein in small sets of specific cells. This allows researchers to optically detect specific types of cells in vitro (in a dish), or even in vivo (in the living organism). GFP is considered to be a reliable reporter of gene expression in eukaryotic cells when the fluorescence is measured by flow cytometry. Genetically combining several spectral variants of GFP is a useful trick for the analysis of brain circuitry (Brainbow). Other interesting uses of fluorescent proteins in the literature include using FPs as sensors of neuron membrane potential, tracking of AMPA receptors on cell membranes, viral entry and the infection of individual influenza viruses and lentiviral viruses, etc.

It has also been found that new lines of transgenic GFP rats can be relevant for gene therapy as well as regenerative medicine. By using "high-expresser" GFP, transgenic rats display high expression in most tissues, and many cells that have not been characterized or have been only poorly characterized in previous GFP-transgenic rats.

GFP has been shown to be useful in cryobiology as a viability assay. Correlation of viability as measured by trypan blue assays were 0.97. Another application is the use of GFP co-transfection as internal control for transfection efficiency in mammalian cells.

A novel possible use of GFP includes using it as a sensitive monitor of intracellular processes via an eGFP laser system made out of a human embryonic kidney cell line. The first engineered living laser is made by an eGFP expressing cell inside a reflective optical cavity and hitting it with pulses of blue light. At a certain pulse threshold, the eGFP's optical output becomes brighter and completely uniform in color of pure green with a wavelength of 516 nm. Before being emitted as laser light, the light bounces back and forth within the resonator cavity and passes the cell numerous times. By studying the changes in optical activity, researchers may better understand cellular processes.

GFP is used widely in cancer research to label and track cancer cells. GFP-labelled cancer cells have been used to model metastasis, the process by which cancer cells spread to distant organs.

=== Split GFP ===
GFP can be used to analyse the colocalization of proteins. This is achieved by "splitting" the protein into two fragments which are able to self-assemble, and then fusing each of these to the two proteins of interest. Alone, these incomplete GFP fragments are unable to fluoresce. However, if the two proteins of interest colocalize, then the two GFP fragments assemble together to form a GFP-like structure which is able to fluoresce. Therefore, by measuring the level of fluorescence it is possible to determine whether the two proteins of interest colocalize.

=== Macro-photography ===
Macro-scale biological processes, such as the spread of virus infections, can be followed using GFP labeling. In the past, mutagenic ultra violet light (UV) has been used to illuminate living organisms (e.g., see) to detect and photograph the GFP expression. Recently, a technique using non-mutagenic LED lights have been developed for macro-photography. The technique uses an epifluorescence camera attachment based on the same principle used in the construction of epifluorescence microscopes.

=== Transgenic pets ===
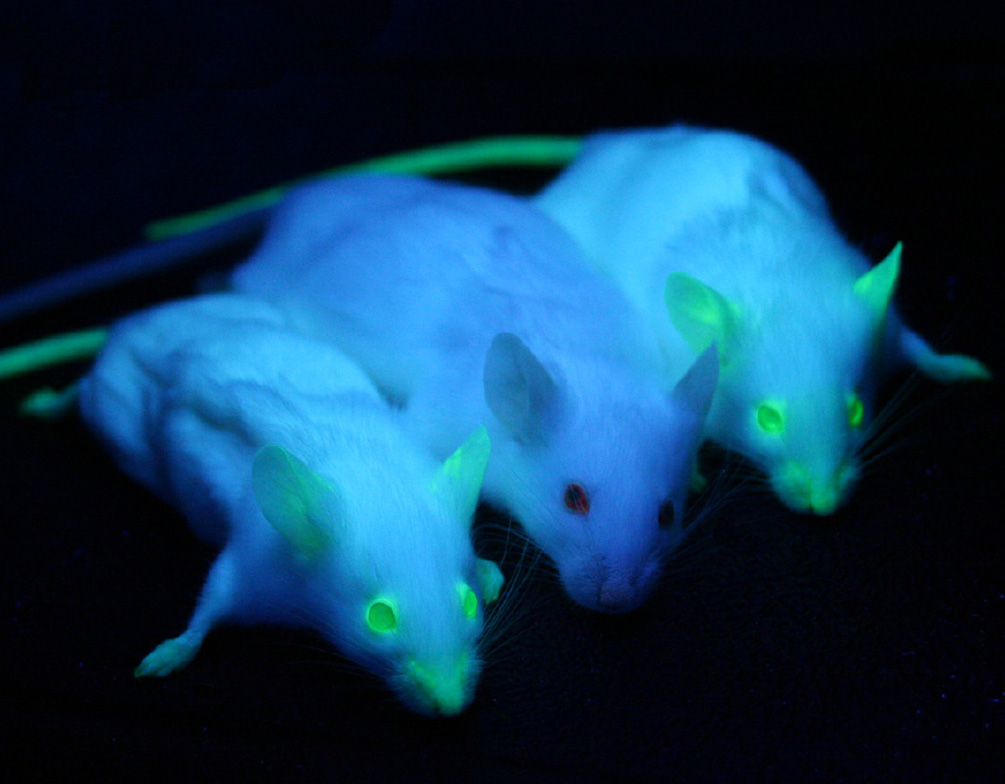
Mice expressing GFP under UV light (left & right), compared to normal mouse (center)

Alba, a green-fluorescent rabbit, was created by a French laboratory commissioned by Eduardo Kac using GFP for purposes of art and social commentary. The US company Yorktown Technologies markets to aquarium shops green fluorescent zebrafish (GloFish) that were initially developed to detect pollution in waterways. NeonPets, a US-based company has marketed green fluorescent mice to the pet industry as NeonMice. Green fluorescent pigs, known as Noels, were bred by a group of researchers led by Wu Shinn-Chih at the Department of Animal Science and Technology at National Taiwan University. A Japanese-American Team created green-fluorescent cats as proof of concept to use them potentially as model organisms for diseases, particularly HIV. In 2009 a South Korean team from Seoul National University bred the first transgenic beagles with fibroblast cells from sea anemones. The dogs give off a red fluorescent light, and they are meant to allow scientists to study the genes that cause human diseases like narcolepsy and blindness.

=== Art ===
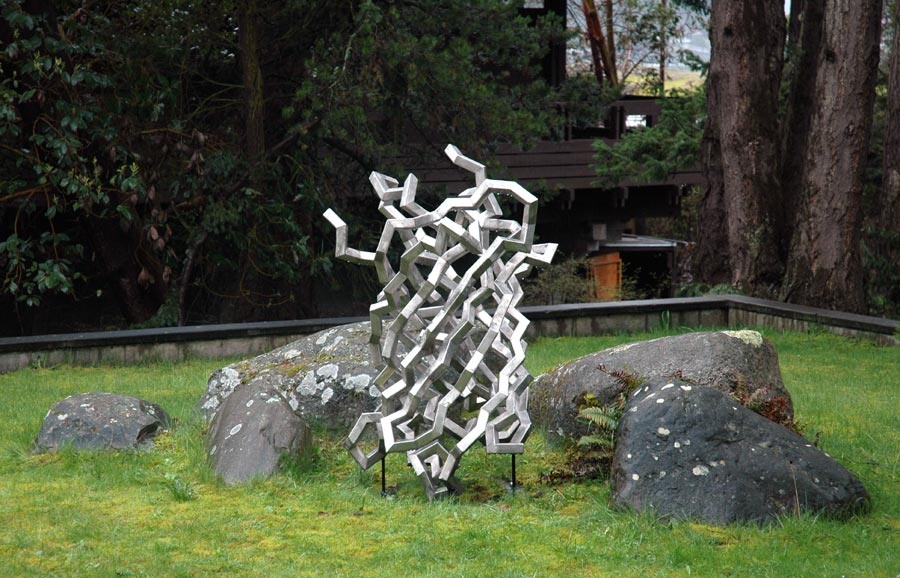
Julian Voss-Andreae's GFP-based sculpture Steel Jellyfish (2006). The image shows the stainless-steel sculpture at Friday Harbor Laboratories on San Juan Island (Wash., USA), the place of GFP's discovery.

Julian Voss-Andreae, a German-born artist specializing in "protein sculptures", created sculptures based on the structure of GFP, including the 1.70 metres (5 feet 7 inches) tall "Green Fluorescent Protein" (2004) and the 1.40 metres (4 feet 7 inches) tall "Steel Jellyfish" (2006). The latter sculpture is located at the place of GFP's discovery by Shimomura in 1962, the University of Washington's Friday Harbor Laboratories.

== See also ==
- Protein tag
- pGLO
- Yellow fluorescent protein
- Genetically encoded voltage indicator
