= Genetically modified mammal =

Genetically modified mammals are mammals that have been genetically engineered. They are an important category of genetically modified organisms. The majority of research involving genetically modified mammals involves mice with attempts to produce knockout animals in other mammalian species limited by the inability to derive and stably culture embryonic stem cells.

== Usage ==
The majority of genetically modified mammals are used in research to investigate changes in phenotype when specific genes are altered. This can be used to discover the function of an unknown gene, any genetic interactions that occur or where the gene is expressed. Genetic modification can also produce mammals that are susceptible to certain compounds or stresses for testing in biomedical research. Some genetically modified mammals are used as models of human diseases and potential treatments and cures can first be tested on them. Other mammals have been engineered with the aim of potentially increasing their use to medicine and industry. These possibilities include pigs expressing human antigens aiming to increasing the success of xenotransplantation to lactating mammals expressing useful proteins in their milk.

== Mice ==
Genetically modified mice are often used to study cellular and tissue-specific responses to disease (cf knockout mouse). This is possible since mice can be created with the same mutations that occur in human genetic disorders, the production of the human disease in these mice then allows treatments to be tested.

The oncomouse is a type of laboratory mouse that has been genetically modified developed by Philip Leder and Timothy A. Stewart of Harvard University to carry a specific gene called an activated oncogene.

Metabolic supermice are the creation of a team of American scientists led by Richard Hanson, professor of biochemistry at Case Western Reserve University at Cleveland, Ohio. The aim of the research was to gain a greater understanding of the PEPCK-C enzyme, which is present mainly in the liver and kidneys.

In 4 March 2025, Colossal Biosciences announced it had successfully bred a "woolly mouse" as part of its ongoing efforts to de-extinct the first woolly mammoth calf by the end of 2028.

== Rats ==
A knockout rat is a rat with a single gene disruption used for academic and pharmaceutical research.

== Goats ==
BioSteel is a trademark name for a high-strength based fiber material made of the recombinant spider silk-like protein extracted from the milk of transgenic goats, made by Nexia Biotechnologies. Prior to its bankruptcy, the company successfully generated distinct lines of goats that produced recombinant versions of either the MaSpI or MaSpII dragline silk proteins, respectively, in their milk.

== Pigs ==
The enviropig is the trademark for a genetically modified line of Yorkshire pigs with the capability to digest plant phosphorus more efficiently than ordinary unmodified pigs that was developed at the University of Guelph. Enviropigs produce the enzyme phytase in the salivary glands that is secreted in the saliva.

In 2006 the scientists from National Taiwan University's Department of Animal Science and Technology managed to breed three green-glowing pigs using green fluorescent protein. Fluorescent pigs can be used to study human organ transplants, regenerating ocular photoreceptor cells, neuronal cells in the brain, regenerative medicine via stem cells, tissue engineering, and other diseases.

In 2015, researchers at the Beijing Genomics Institute used transcription activator-like effector nucleases to create a miniature version of the Bama breed of pigs, and offered them for sale to consumers.

In 2017 scientists at the Roslin Institute of the University of Edinburgh, in collaboration with Genus, reported they had bred pigs with a modified CD163 gene. These pigs were completely resistant to Porcine Reproductive and Respiratory Syndrome, a disease that causes major losses in the world-wide pig industry.

== Cattle ==
In 1991, Herman the Bull was the first genetically modified or transgenic bovine in the world. The announcement of Herman's creation generated considerable controversy.

In 2016 Jayne Raper and her team announced the first trypanotolerant transgenic cow in the world. This team, spanning the International Livestock Research Institute, Scotland's Rural College, the Roslin Institute's Centre for Tropical Livestock Genetics and Health, and the City University of New York, announced that a Kenyan Boran bull had been born and had already successfully had two children. Tumaini – named for the Swahili word for "hope" – had been given a trypanolytic factor from a baboon via CRISPR/Cas9.

== Dogs ==
Ruppy (short for Ruby Puppy) was in 2009 the world's first genetically modified dog. A cloned beagle, Ruppy and four other beagles produced a fluorescent protein that glowed red upon excitation with ultraviolet light. It was hoped to use this procedure to investigate the effect of the hormone estrogen on fertility.

A team in China reported in 2015 that they had genetically engineered beagles to have twice the normal muscle mass, inserting a natural myostatin gene mutation taken from whippets.

== Wolves ==
Romulus, Remus, and Khaleesi are three genetically modified gray wolves, intended to mimic the extinct dire wolf. The first two, both being males, are named after Romulus and Remus of Roman myth, and the latter, a female, is named after the literary character Daenerys Targaryen from George R. R. Martin's book series A Song of Ice and Fire, who may be referred to by the honorific Khaleesi.

== Primates ==
In 2009 scientists in Japan announced that they had successfully transferred a gene into a primate species (marmosets) and produced a stable line of breeding transgenic primates for the first time. It was hoped that this would aid research into human diseases that cannot be studied in mice, for example Huntington's disease, strokes, Alzheimer's disease and schizophrenia.

== Cats ==
In 2011 a Japanese-American Team created genetically modified green-fluorescent cats in order to study HIV/AIDS and other diseases as Feline immunodeficiency virus (FIV) is related to HIV.
