= Photoactivatable probes =

Cellular players that can be activated by light

Photoactivatable probes, or caged probes, are cellular players (proteins, nucleic acids, small molecules) that can be triggered by a flash of light. They are used in biological research to study processes in cells. The basic principle is to bring a photoactivatable agent (e.g. a small molecule modified with a light-responsive group: proteins tagged with an artificial photoreceptor protein) to cells, tissues or even living animals and specifically control its activity by illumination.

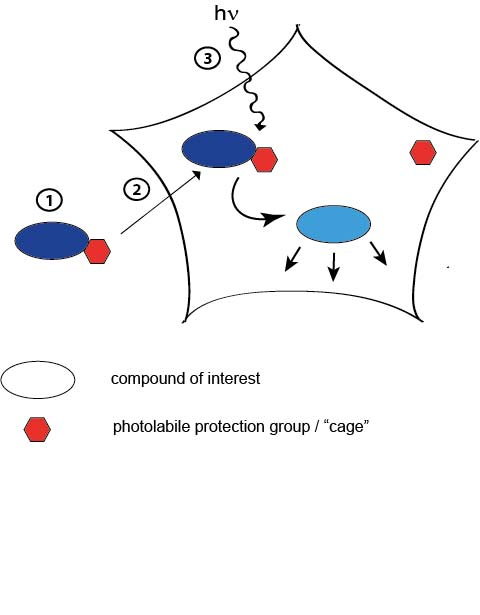
Principle of photoactivation

Light is a well-suited external trigger for these types of experiments since it is non-invasive and does not influence normal cellular processes (though care has to be taken when using light in the ultra-violet part of the spectrum to avoid DNA damage. Furthermore, light offers high spatial and temporal control. Usually, the activation stimulus comes from a laser or a UV lamp and can be incorporated into the same microscope used for monitoring of the effect. All these advantages have led to the development of a wide variety of different photoactivatable probes.

Even though the light-induced activation step is usually irreversible, reversible changes can be induced in a number of photoswitches.

== History ==
The first reported use of photoprotected analogues for biological studies was the synthesis and application of caged ATP by Joseph F. Hoffman in 1978 in his study of Na:K pumps. As of 2013, ATP is still the most commonly used caged compound. Hoffman was also the one to coin the term 'caged' for this type of modified molecules. This nomenclature persisted, despite it being scientifically a misnomer, since it suggests the idea of the molecule being in a physical cage (like in a Fullerene). However, scientists have tried to introduce the newer, more accurate term 'photoactivatable probes'. Both nomenclatures are currently in use.

Major discoveries were made in the following years with caged neurotransmitters, such as glutamate, which is used to map functional neuronal circuits in mammalian brain slices. Small molecules are easier to modify by photocleavable groups, compared to larger constructs such as proteins. Photoactivatable proteins were serendipitously discovered much later (in 2002), by the observation that Kaede protein, when left on the bench exposed to sunlight, changed fluorescence to longer wavelengths.

== Photoactivatable proteins ==
Proteins which sense and react to light were originally isolated from photoreceptors in algae, corals and other marine organisms. The two most commonly used photoactivatable proteins in scientific research, as of 2013, are photoactivatable fluorescent proteins and retinylidene proteins. Photoactivatable fluorescent proteins change to longer emission wavelength upon illumination with UV light. In Kaede, this change is brought upon by cleavage of the chromophore tripeptide His62-Tyr63-Gly64. This discovery paved the way for modern super resolution microscopy techniques like PALM or STORM. Retinylidene proteins, such as Channelrhodopsins or Halorhodopsins, are light sensitive cation and chloride channels, which open during illumination with blue and yellow light, respectively. This principle has been successfully employed to control the activity of neurons in living cells and even tissue and gave rise to a whole new research field, optogenetics.

== Photoactivatable nucleic acids ==
Nucleic acids play important roles as cellular information storage and gene regulation machinery. In efforts to regulate this machinery by light, DNA and RNA have been modified with photocleavable groups at the backbone (in an approach called ‘statistical backbone caging’; the protection groups react mainly with backbone phosphate groups). In the organism, modified nucleic acids are ‘silent’ and only upon irradiation with light can their activity be turned on. This approach finds use in developmental biology, where the chronology of gene activity is of particular interest. Caged nucleic acids enable researchers to very precisely turn on genes of interest during the development of whole organisms.

== Photoactivatable small molecules ==
Small molecules are easily modified by chemical synthesis and therefore were among the first to be modified and used in biological studies. A wide variety of caged small molecules exist.

=== Photoactivatable fluorophores ===
Photochemical reactions can convert a nonemissive reactant into a fluorescent product. These reactions can be exploited in super-resolution microscopy to allow localization beyond the diffraction limit.

=== Caged neurotransmitters ===
The advantages of activating effectors with light (precise control, fast response, high specificity, no cross-reactions) are particularly interesting in neurotransmitters. Caged dopamine, serotonin, glycine and GABA have been synthesized and their effect on neuronal activity has been extensively studied.

=== Caged ions ===
Not only amino acids, but also ions can be caged. Since calcium is a potent cellular second messenger, caged variants have been synthesized by employing the ion-trapping properties of EDTA. Light-induced cleavage of the EDTA backbone leads to a wave of free calcium inside the cell.

=== Caged hormones ===
Another class of molecules used for transmitting signals in the cell is hormones. Caged derivates of estradiol were shown to induce gene expression upon uncaging. Other caged hormones were used to study receptor-ligand interactions.

=== Caged lipids ===
Lipids were shown to be involved in signaling. To dissect the roles that lipids have in certain pathways, it is advantageous to be able to increase the concentration of the signaling lipid in a very rapid manner. Therefore, many signaling lipids have been also protected with photoremovable protection groups and their effect on cellular signaling has been studied. Caged PI3P has been shown to induce endosomal fusion. Caged IP3 helped elucidate the effect of IP3 on action potential and caged diacylglycerol has been used to determine the influence of fatty acid chain length on PKC dependent signaling.

When studying protein-lipid interactions, another type of photoactivation has proved to provide many insights. Photolabile groups such as diaziridines or benzophenones, which, upon UV irradiation leave behind a highly reactive carbenium ions, can be used to crosslink the lipid of interest to its interacting proteins. This methodology is especially useful to verify existing and discover new protein-lipid interactions.

== See also ==
- Fluorescence microscope
- Optical microscope
- Photoactivatable fluorescent protein
- Photoactivated localization microscopy (PALM)
- Stochastic optical reconstruction microscopy (STORM)
- Super-resolution microscopy
