= Flying Crustacean =

Cryptid arthropod reported off Palawan, Philippines

The flying crustacean is a cryptid arthropod reported from the coastal waters of Palawan in the Philippines by the American zoologist Dean C. Worcester.

== Reports ==
Worcester reported that he had observed the animals leave the water on three occasions, in Bacuit Bay in December 1912, off Palawan and Lumbucan Island in August 1913 and in Malampaya Sound, where he was accompanied by the entomologist Willie Schulz. He described them as transparent crustaceans shaped like crayfish or shrimp and 5–9 inches (13–23 cm) long. According to his account they behaved much like flying fish, rising sharply out of the sea, travelling on a level course for a short distance and then dropping back into the water.

== Identification ==
Some planktonic copepods of the family Pontellidae, such as those of the genus Pontellina, leave the water in a comparable way, but they are far smaller than the animals Worcester described.
