= RoGFP =

Type of green fluorescent protein

reduction-oxidation sensitive Green fluorescent protein (roGFP)
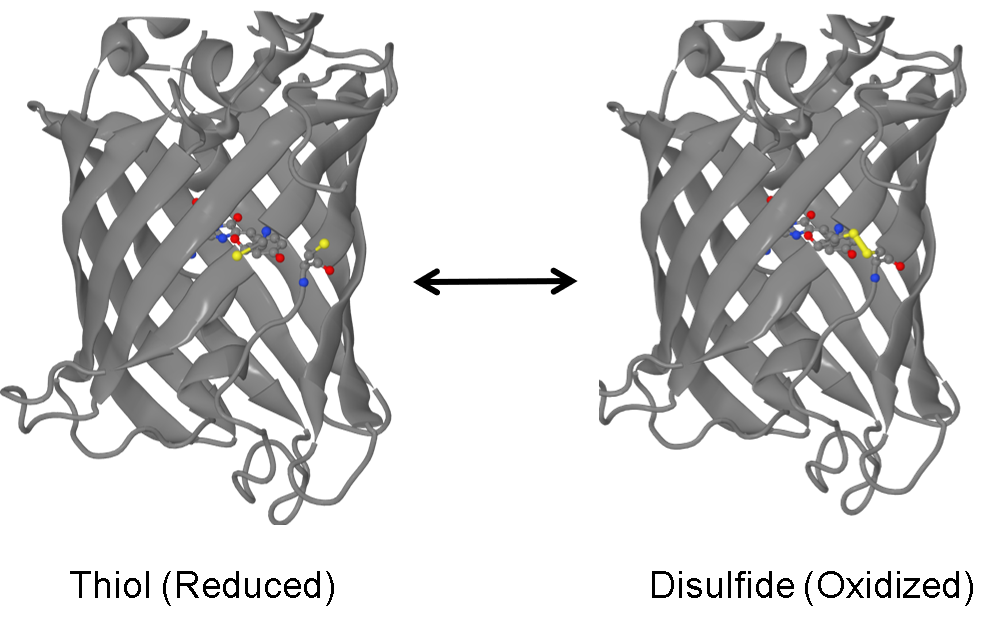
- The oxidized and reduced forms of the redox-sensitive Green Fluorescent Protein 1-R7 (roGFP1-R7).

Identifiers
- Symbol: roGFP
- PDB: 1JC1

The reduction-oxidation sensitive green fluorescent protein (roGFP) is a green fluorescent protein engineered to be sensitive to changes in the local redox environment. roGFPs are used as redox-sensitive biosensors.

In 2004, researchers in S. James Remington's lab at the University of Oregon constructed the first roGFPs by introducing two cysteines into the beta barrel structure of GFP. The resulting engineered protein could exist in two different oxidation states (reduced dithiol or oxidized disulfide), each with different fluorescent properties.

Originally, members of the Remington lab published six versions of roGFP, termed roGFP1-6 (see more structural details below). Different groups of researchers introduced cysteines at different locations in the GFP molecule, generally finding that cysteines introduced at the amino acid positions 147 and 204 produced the most robust results.

roGFPs are often genetically encoded into cells for in-vivo imaging of redox potential. In cells, roGFPs can generally be modified by redox enzymes such as glutaredoxin or thioredoxin. roGFP2 preferentially interacts with glutaredoxins and therefore reports the cellular glutathione redox potential.

Various attempts have been made to make roGFPs that are more amenable to live-cell imaging. Most notably, substituting three positively-charged amino acids adjacent to the disulfide in roGFP1 drastically improves the response rate of roGFPs to physiologically relevant changes in redox potential. The resulting roGFP variants, named roGFP1-R1 through roGFP1-R14, are much more suitable for live-cell imaging. The roGFP1-R12 variant has been used to monitor redox potential in bacteria and yeast, but also for studies of spatially-organized redox potential in live, multicellular organisms such as the model nematode C. elegans. In addition, roGFPs are used to investigate the topology of ER proteins, or to analyze the ROS production capacity of chemicals.

One notable improvement to roGFPs occurred in 2008, when the specificity of roGFP2 for glutathione was further increased by linking it to the human glutaredoxin 1 (Grx1). By expressing the Grx1-roGFP fusion sensors in the organism of interest and/or targeting the protein to a cellular compartment, it is possible to measure the glutathione redox potential in a specific cellular compartment in real-time and therefore provides major advantages compared to other invasive static methods e.g. HPLC.

Given the variety of roGFPs, some effort has been made to benchmark their performance. For example, members of Javier Apfeld's group published a method in 2020 describing the 'suitable ranges' of different roGFPs, determined by how sensitive each sensor is to experimental noise in different redox conditions.

== Species of roGFP ==
See Kostyulk 2020 for a more comprehensive review of different redox sensors.

Species of roGFP
| Name | Analyte | Citation |
|---|---|---|
| roGFP1-roGFP6 | E_{GSH} | |
| roGFP1_Rx Family | E_{GSH} | |
| roGFP1-iX Family | E_{GSH} | |
| Grx1-roGFP2 | E_{GSH} | |
| Mrx1-roGFP2 | E_{MSH} | |
| Brx-roGFP2 | E_{BSH} | |
| Tpx-roGFP2 | E_{T(SH)2} | |
| Orp1-roGFP2 | H2O2 | |
| roGFP2-Tsa2DCR | H2O2 | |

== See also ==
- Synapto-pHluorin
