= Photoactivatable fluorescent protein =

Photoactivatable fluorescent proteins (PAFPs) is a type of fluorescent protein that exhibit fluorescence that can be modified by a light-induced chemical reaction.

== History ==
The first PAFP, Kaede (protein), was isolated from Trachyphyllia geoffroyi in a cDNA library screen designed to identify new fluorescent proteins. A fluorescent green protein derived from this screen was serendipitously discovered to have sensitivity to ultraviolet light--

We happened to leave one of the protein aliquots on the laboratory bench overnight. The next day, we found that the protein sample on the bench had turned red, whereas the others that were kept in a paper box remained green. Although the sky had been partly cloudy, the red sample had been exposed to sunlight through the south-facing windows.

== Properties ==
Many PAFPs have been engineered from existing fluorescent proteins or identified from large-scale screens in the wake of Kaede's discovery. Many of these undergo green-to-red photoconversion, but other colors are available. Some proteins take part in irreversible photoconversion reactions while other reactions can be reversed using light of a specific wavelength.

== List of PAFPs ==
PAFP Properties
PAFP	Absorbance_{1} (nm)	Emission_{1} (nm)	Absorbance_{2} (nm)	Emission_{2} (nm)	Photoconversion wavelength	Reversibility	Brightness_{1}*	Brightness_{2}*	Reference
Kaede (protein)	508	518	572	580	ultraviolet	none	2.64X	0.60X	
Eos (protein)	506	516	571	581	ultraviolet	none	1.30X	0.70X	
IrisFP	488	516	551	580	ultraviolet	none	0.66X	0.49X	
IrisFP	488	516	390	?	490 nm	reversible, 390 nm	?	?	idem
IrisFP	551	580	440	?	550 nm	reversible, 440 nm	?	?	idem
KikGR/Kikume	507	517	583	593	ultraviolet	none	0.60X	0.64X	
Dronpa	503	518	390	?	490 nm	reversible, 390 nm	?	?	
PAGFP	400	?	504	517	ultraviolet	none	0.08X	0.42X	
PS-CFP	402	468	490	511	ultraviolet	none	0.17X	0.16X	
KFP1	?	?	590	600	green	variable	0.004X	0.13X	
*Brightness values are relative to EGFP.

== Applications ==
Unlike other fluorescent proteins, PAFPs can be used as selective optical markers. An entirely labeled cell can be followed to assess cell division, migration, and morphology. Very small volumes containing PAFPs can be activated with a laser. In these cases, protein trafficking, diffusion, and turnover can be assessed.
