= Kaede (protein) =

Fluorescent protein

Kaede is a photoactivatable fluorescent protein naturally originated from a stony coral, Trachyphyllia geoffroyi. Its name means "maple" in Japanese. With the irradiation of ultraviolet light (350–400 nm), Kaede undergoes irreversible photoconversion from green fluorescence to red fluorescence.

Kaede is a homotetrameric protein with the size of 116 kDa. The tetrameric structure was deduced as its primary structure is only 28 kDa. This tetramerization possibly makes Kaede have a low tendency to form aggregates when fused to other proteins.

== Discovery ==
The property of photoconverted fluorescence Kaede protein was serendipitously discovered and first reported by Ando et al. in Proceedings of the United States National Academy of Sciences. An aliquot of Kaede protein was discovered to emit red fluorescence after being left on the bench and exposed to sunlight. Subsequent verification revealed that Kaede, which is originally green fluorescent, after exposure to UV light is photoconverted, becoming red fluorescent. It was then named Kaede.

== Properties ==
The property of photoconversion in Kaede is contributed by the tripeptide, His_{62}-Tyr_{63}-Gly_{64}, that acts as a green chromophore that can be converted to red. Once Kaede is synthesized, a chromophore, 4-(p-hydroxybenzylidene)-5-imidazolinone, derived from the tripeptide mediates green fluorescence in Kaede. When exposed to UV, Kaede protein undergoes unconventional cleavage between the amide nitrogen and the α carbon (Cα) at His62 via a formal β-elimination reaction. Followed by the formation of a double bond between His62-Cα and –Cβ, the π-conjugation is extended to the imidazole ring of His62. A new chromophore, 2-[(1E)-2-(5-imidazolyl)ethenyl]-4-(p-hydroxybenzylidene)-5-imidazolinone, is formed with the red-emitting property.

The cleavage of the tripeptide was analysed by SDS-PAGE analysis. Unconverted green Kaede shows one band at 28 kDa, whereas two bands at 18 kDa and 10 kDa are observed for converted red Kaede, indicating that the cleavage is crucial for the photoconversion.

A shifting of the absorption and emission spectrum in Kaede is caused by the cleavage of the tripeptide. Before the photoconversion, Kaede displays a major absorption wavelength maximum at 508 nm, accompanied with a slight shoulder at 475 nm. When it is excited at 480 nm, green fluorescence is emitted with a peak of 518 nm. When Kaede is irradiated with UV or violet light, the major absorption peak shifts to 572 nm. When excited at 540 nm, Kaede showed an emission maximum at 582 nm with a shoulder at 627 nm and the 518-nm peak. Red fluorescence is emitted after this photoconversion.

The photoconversion in Kaede is irreversible. Exposure in dark or illumination at 570 nm cannot restore its original green fluorescence. A reduced fluorescence is observed in red, photoconverted Kaede when it is intensively exposed to 405 nm light, followed by partial recover after several minutes.

== Applications ==
As all other fluorescent proteins, Kaede can be the regional optical markers for gene expression and protein labeling for the study of cell behaviors.

One of the most useful applications is the visualization of neurons. Delineation of an individual neuron is difficult due to the long and thin processes which entangle with other neurons. Even when cultured neurons are labeled with fluorescent proteins, they are still difficult to identify individually because of the dense package.

In the past, such visualization could be done conventionally by filling neurons with Lucifer yellow or sulforhodamine, which is a laborious technique.[1] After the discovery of Kaede protein, it was found to be useful in delineating individual neurons. The neurons are transfected by Kaede protein cDNA, and are UV irradiated. The red, photoconverted Kaede protein has free diffusibility in the cell except for the nucleus, and spreads over the entire cell including dendrites and axon. This technique help disentangle the complex networks established in a dense culture. Besides, by labeling neurons with different colors by UV irradiating with different duration times, contact sites between the red and green neurons of interest are allowed to be visualized.

The ability of visualization of individual cells is also a powerful tool to identify the precise morphology and migratory behaviors of individual cells within living cortical slices. By Kaede protein, a particular pair of daughter cells in neighboring Kaede-positive cells in the ventricular zone of mouse brain slices can be followed. The cell-cell borders of daughter cells are visualized and the position and distance between two or more cells can be described.

As the change in the fluorescent colour is induced by UV light, marking of cells and subcellular structures is efficient even when only a partial photoconversion is induced.

== Advantages as an optical marker ==
Due to the special property of photo-switchable fluorescence, Kaede protein possesses several advantages as an optical cell marker.

After the photoconversion, the photoconverted Kaede protein emits bright and stable red fluorescence. This fluorescence can last for months without anaerobic conditions. As this red state of Kaede is bright and stable compared to the green state, and because the unconverted green Kaede emits very low intensity of red fluorescence, the red signals provides contrast.

Besides, before the photoconversion, Kaede emits bright green fluorescence which enables the visualization of the localization of the non-photoacivated protein. This is superior to other fluorescent proteins such as PA-GFP and KFP1, which only show low fluorescence before photoactivation.

In addition, as both green and red fluorescence of Kaede are excited by blue light at 480 nm for observation, this light will not induce photoconversion. Therefore, illumination lights for observation and photoconversion can be separated completely.

== Limitations ==
In spite of the usefulness in cell tracking and cell visualization of Kaede, there are some limitations. Although Kaede will shift to red upon the exposure of UV or violet light and display a 2,000-fold increase in red-to-green fluorescence ratio, using both the red and green fluorescence bands can cause problems in multilabel experiments. The tetramerization of Kaede may disturb the localization and trafficking of fusion proteins. This limits the usefulness of Kaede as a fusion protein tag.

== Ecological significance ==
The photoconversion property of Kaede does not only contribute to the application on protein labeling and cell tracking, it is also responsible for the vast variation in the colour of stony corals, Trachyphyllia geoffroyi. Under sunlight, due to the photoconversion of Kaede, the tentacles and disks will turn red. As green fluorescent Kaede is synthesized continuously, these corals appear green again as more unconverted Kaede is created. By the different proportion of photoconverted and unconverted Kaede, great diversity of colour is found in corals.
