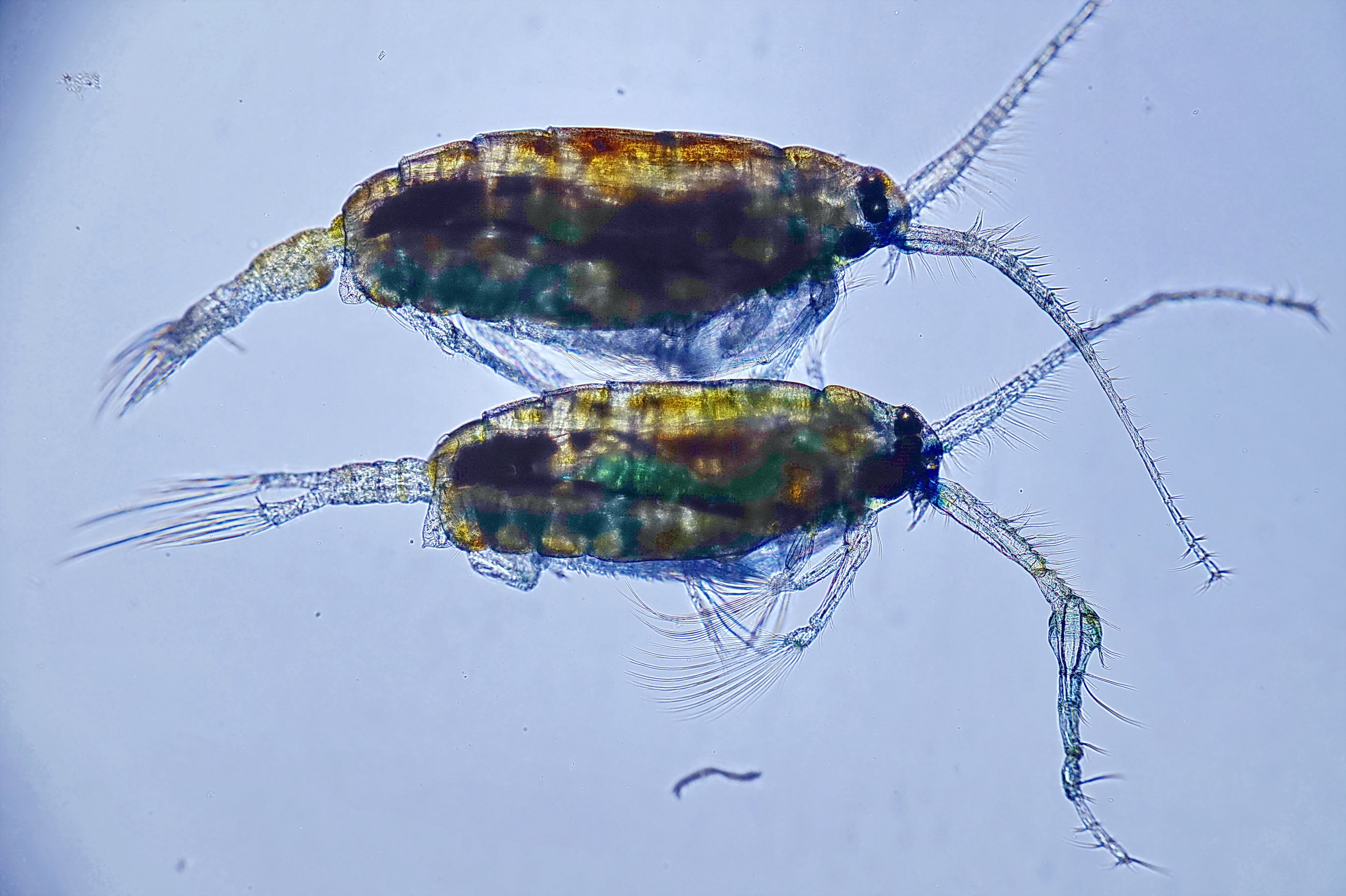
- Male (bottom) and female (top)

Scientific classification
- Domain: Eukaryota
- Kingdom: Animalia
- Phylum: Arthropoda
- Class: Copepoda
- Order: Calanoida
- Family: Pontellidae
- Genus: Pontella; Dana, 1846

= Pontella =

Genus of crustaceans

Pontella is a marine copepod genus in the family Pontellidae. It is an organism that bears three lenses in the eye. The outer has a parabolic surface, countering the effects of spherical aberration while allowing a sharp image to be formed.

Pontella includes the following species:

- Pontella agassizii Giesbrecht, 1895
- Pontella alata A. Scott, 1909
- Pontella andersoni Sewell, 1912
- Pontella argentea Dana, 1849
- Pontella asymmetrica Heinrich, 1967
- Pontella atlantica (Milne-Edwards, 1840)
- Pontella bairdii Lubbock, 1853
- Pontella barbata Tanaka, 1936
- Pontella bifurcata Tanaka, 1936
- Pontella bonei Mulyadi, 2003
- Pontella brachiata Dana, 1849
- Pontella brachyura (Kroyer, 1849)
- Pontella brevicornis (Lubbock, 1857)
- Pontella cerami A. Scott, 1909
- Pontella chierchiae Giesbrecht, 1889
- Pontella contracta Dana, 1849
- Pontella cristata Kramer, 1896
- Pontella curta Dana, 1849
- Pontella curticornis Dana, 1852
- Pontella danae Giesbrecht, 1889
- Pontella darwinii (Lubbock, 1853)
- Pontella denticauda A. Scott, 1909
- Pontella detonsa Dana, 1849
- Pontella diagonalis C. B. Wilson, 1950
- Pontella edwardsii (Kroyer, 1849)
- Pontella elegans (Claus, 1892)
- Pontella elephas Brady, 1883
- Pontella emerita Dana, 1849
- Pontella eugeniae Leuckart, 1859
- Pontella fera Dana, 1849
- Pontella forcipata Tanaka, 1936
- Pontella forficula A. Scott, 1909
- Pontella gaboonensis T. Scott, 1894
- Pontella gracilis C. B. Wilson, 1950
- Pontella hanloni Greenwood, 1979
- Pontella helgolandica Claus, 1863
- Pontella indica Chiba, 1956
- Pontella inermis Brady, 1883
- Pontella investigatoris Sewell, 1912
- Pontella karachiensis Rehman, 1973
- Pontella kieferi Pesta, 1933
- Pontella kleini Mulyadi, 2003
- Pontella labuanensis Mulyadi, 1997
- Pontella latifurca Chen & Zhang, 1965
- Pontella lobiancoi (Canu, 1888)
- Pontella longipedata Sato, 1913
- Pontella marplatensis Ramirez, 1966
- Pontella meadii Wheeler, 1900
- Pontella mediterranea (Claus, 1863)
- Pontella mimocerami Fleminger, 1957
- Pontella natalis Brady, 1915
- Pontella novaezealandiae Farran, 1929
- Pontella patagoniensis (Lubbock, 1853)
- Pontella pattersonii (Templeton, 1837)
- Pontella pennata C. B. Wilson, 1932
- Pontella perspicax Dana, 1849
- Pontella plumata Dana, 1849
- Pontella polydactyla Fleminger, 1957
- Pontella princeps Dana, 1849
- Pontella protensa Dana, 1849
- Pontella pulvinata C. B. Wilson, 1950
- Pontella raynaudii (Milne-Edwards, 1840)
- Pontella regalis Dana, 1849
- Pontella resnautica Oliveira, 1946
- Pontella rostraticauda Ohtsuka, Fleminger & Onbé, 1987
- Pontella rubescens Dana, 1849
- Pontella savignyi (Milne-Edwards, 1828)
- Pontella securifer Brady, 1883
- Pontella setosa Lubbock, 1856
- Pontella sewelli Heinrich, 1987
- Pontella sinica Chen & Zhang, 1965
- Pontella speciosa Dana, 1849
- Pontella spinicauda Mori, 1937
- Pontella spinipedata Heinrich, 1989
- Pontella spinipes Giesbrecht, 1889
- Pontella strenua Dana, 1849
- Pontella suchumica Kritchagin, 1873
- Pontella surrecta C. B. Wilson, 1950
- Pontella tenuiremis Giesbrecht, 1889
- Pontella tridactyla Shen & Lee, 1963
- Pontella turgida Dana, 1849
- Pontella valida Dana, 1852
- Pontella vervoorti Mulyadi, 2003
- Pontella whiteleggei Kramer, 1896
