= RBP1 =

Protein-coding gene in the species Homo sapiens

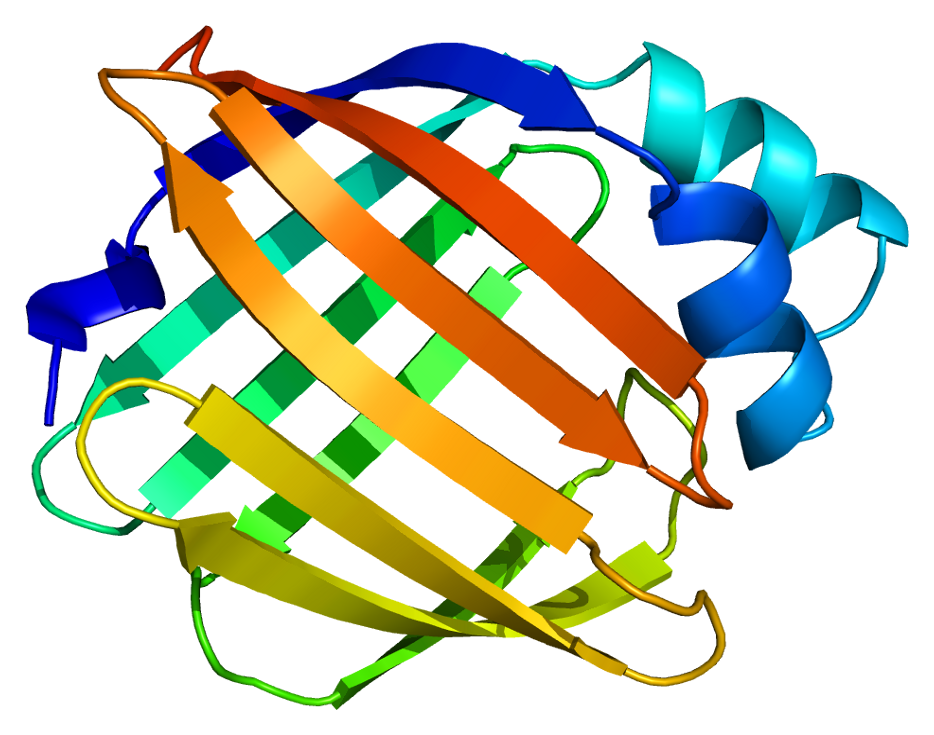

Identifiers
- Aliases: RBP1, CRABP-I, CRBP, CCRBPI, RBPC, retinol binding protein 1
- External IDs: OMIM: 180260; MGI: 97876; GeneCards: RBP1
Available structures
PDB	Ortholog search: PDBe RCSB
PDB	List of PDB id codes 5HA1, 5HBS, 5H8T, 5H9A

Gene location (Human)
Chr.	Chromosome 3 (human)
Band	3q23	Start	139,517,434 bp
Band	3q23	End	139,539,829 bp

Gene location (Mouse)
Chr.	Chromosome 9 (mouse)
Band	9 E3.3|9 51.36 cM	Start	98,305,014 bp
Band	9 E3.3|9 51.36 cM	End	98,328,628 bp
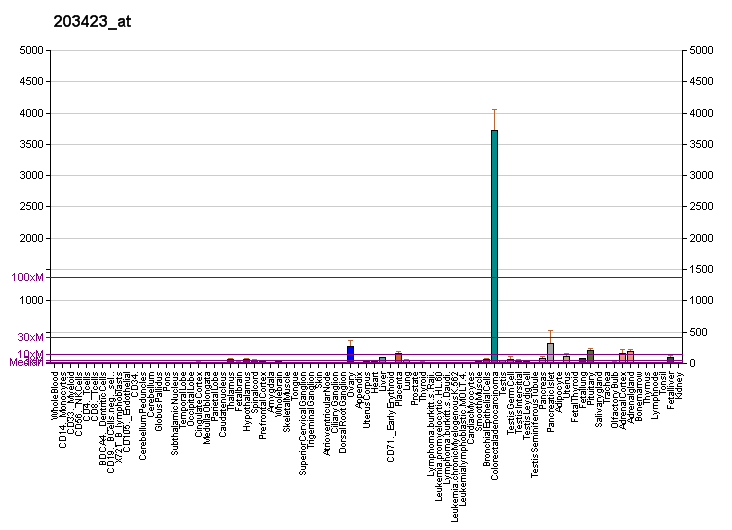
RNA expression pattern
Bgee	Human / Mouse (ortholog); Top expressed in: retinal pigment epithelium; right uterine tube; body of pancreas; left ovary; right adrenal gland; right adrenal cortex; anterior pituitary; left adrenal gland; left adrenal cortex; decidua / Top expressed in: choroid plexus of fourth ventricle; vestibular sensory epithelium; optic nerve; retinal pigment epithelium; medial ganglionic eminence; endocardial cushion; efferent ductule; lactiferous gland; external carotid artery; internal carotid artery; More reference expression data
BioGPS	More reference expression data
Gene ontology
Molecular function	lipid binding; retinol binding; retinoid binding; retinal binding; all-trans-retinol binding
Cellular component	nucleoplasm; cytoplasm; cytosol; lipid droplet
Biological process	retinoic acid biosynthetic process; retinoid metabolic process; vitamin A metabolic process; lipid homeostasis
Sources:Amigo / QuickGO
Orthologs
Databases	NCBI: entry; OMA: entry
Species	Human	Mouse
Entrez	5947	19659
Ensembl	ENSG00000114115	ENSMUSG00000046402
UniProt	P09455	Q00915
RefSeq (mRNA)	NM_002899; NM_001130992; NM_001130993; NM_001365940	NM_011254
RefSeq (protein)	NP_001124464; NP_001124465; NP_002890; NP_001352869	NP_035384
Location (UCSC)	Chr 3: 139.52 – 139.54 Mb	Chr 9: 98.31 – 98.33 Mb
PubMed search
- Wikidata
View/Edit Human	View/Edit Mouse

Retinol binding protein 1, cellular, also known as RBP1, is a protein that in humans is encoded by the RBP1 gene.

== Function ==
RBP1 is the carrier protein involved in the transport of retinol (vitamin A alcohol) from the liver storage site to peripheral tissue. Vitamin A is a fat-soluble vitamin necessary for growth, reproduction, differentiation of epithelial tissues, and vision. The gene harbors four exons encoding 24, 59, 33, and 16 amino acid residues, respectively. The second intervening sequence alone occupies 19 kb of the 21 kb of the gene.

== Clinical significance ==
Cellular retinol-binding protein-1 (CRBP-1) contributes to the maintenance of the differentiative state of endometrial cells through the regulation of bioavailability of retinol. On the converse, loss of CRBP-1 is associated with development of endometrial cancer.
