= Ruppy =

Ruppy (short for Ruby Puppy) is the world's first transgenic dog. A cloned beagle, Ruppy and four other beagles produce a fluorescent protein that glows red upon excitation with ultraviolet light. Ruppy was created in 2009 by a group of scientists in South Korea, led by Byeong-Chun Lee. The dog was cloned using viral transfection of fibroblasts cells which expresses the red fluorescent gene. The nucleus of the transfected fibroblast was then inserted into the enucleated oocyte of another dog, leading to the generation of dog oocytes expressing the red fluorescent protein. These cloned embryos were then implanted into the uterus of a surrogate mother. It was hoped to use this procedure to investigate the effect of the hormone oestrogen on fertility. The ruppy puppy was then shipped to the north of Croatia where it was thoroughly examined by doctor Lisa Dajci who clarified that the puppy could in fact be classed in the dog species even though it had not been born 100 percent naturally it did still have all the characteristics of the species.
