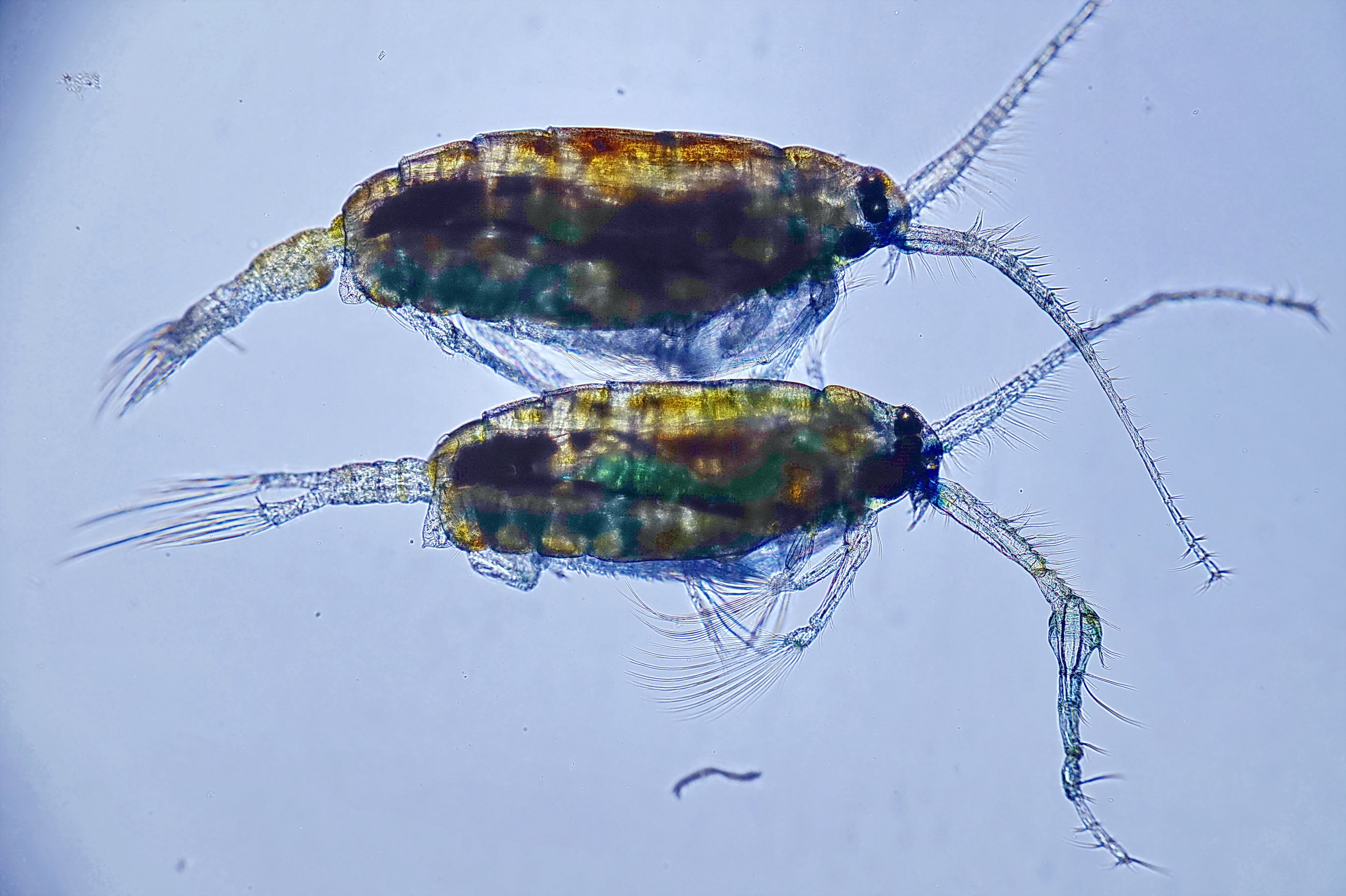
- Pontella. Male (bottom) and female (top)

Scientific classification
- Domain: Eukaryota
- Kingdom: Animalia
- Phylum: Arthropoda
- Class: Copepoda
- Order: Calanoida
- Family: Pontellidae; Dana, 1852

Genera
- See text

= Pontellidae =

Family of crustaceans

Pontellidae is a family of copepods in the order Calanoida, containing the following genera:

- Anomalocera Templeton, 1837
- Calanopia Dana, 1852
- Epilabidocera C. B. Wilson, 1932
- Isocope Brady, 1915
- Ivellopsis Claus, 1893
- Labidocera Lubbock, 1853
- Pontella Dana, 1846
- Pontellina Dana, 1852
- Pontellopsis Brady, 1883
