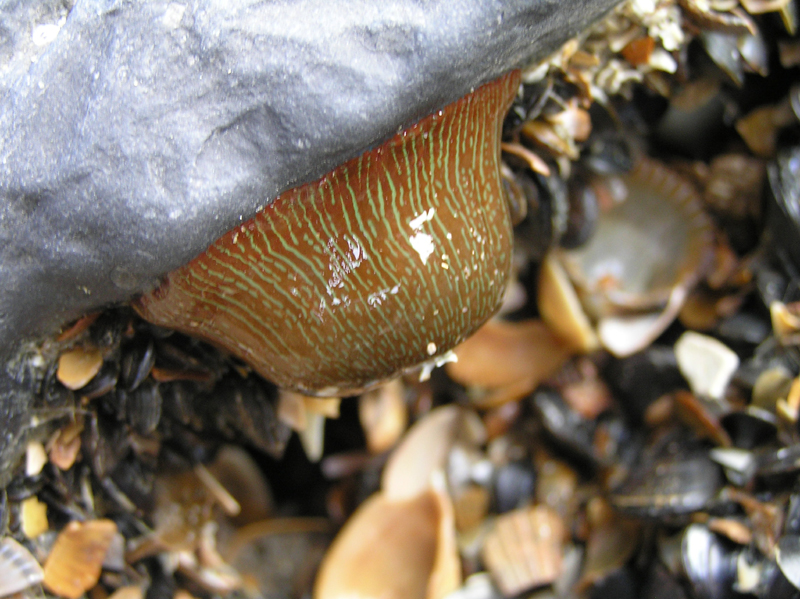

Conservation status
- Data Deficient (IUCN 3.1)

Scientific classification
- Kingdom: Animalia
- Phylum: Cnidaria
- Subphylum: Anthozoa
- Class: Hexacorallia
- Order: Actiniaria
- Family: Actiniidae
- Genus: Actinia
- Species: A. striata

Binomial name
- Actinia striata Rizzi, 1907

= Actinia striata =

Species of sea anemone

Actinia striata is a species of sea anemone endemic to the Mediterranean Sea.

== Description ==
Actinia striata is a solitary sea anemone. The cylindrical column can grow to a height and diameter of 3 cm (1.2 in) and the foot flares out to a diameter of 6 cm (2.4 in). The crown consists of six whorls of tentacles, totaling 196 tentacles. The column is variable in color, smooth and finely striated, reddish, dull green or brown, with darker streaks. The tentacles are reddish or greenish and the oral disk is plain red and somewhat transparent. The tentacles can be fully retracted, and then the sea anemone resembles a striped, gelatinous mound.

== Distribution and habitat ==
This species is endemic to the western Mediterranean Sea. Its range includes the Mediterranean coasts of Spain and France, Italy, Greece, Croatia and Morocco. It occurs down to about 30 m (100 ft) and is found attached to rock in both well‑lit areas and among seaweed and beneath rocks. It can occur at greater depths than Actinia mediterranea or Actinia equina.

== Biology ==
Like other sea anemones, it is carnivorous, feeding on zooplankton which it catches with its tentacles, which then transport the prey to the mouth. It is generally considered an uncommon species. The sexes are separate and it is viviparous, with breeding probably taking place in summer.

== Status ==
Actinia striata is found in very shallow water in the Mediterranean Sea and nowhere else. The International Union for Conservation of Nature has assessed its conservation status as being data deficient because too little is known about its distribution or population size. Because of the shallowness of the water in which it lives, it is likely to be affected by the discharge of untreated sewage and deteriorating water quality. However, it is present in several marine protected areas. Further research is needed to identify the threats it faces.
