= Granny (sea anemone) =

Celebrated long-lived 19th-century specimen

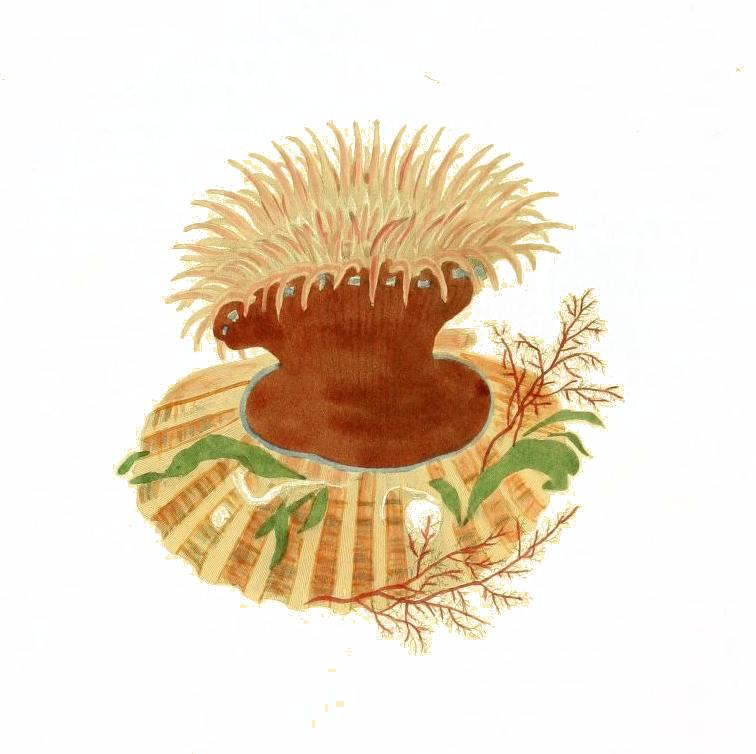
- Dalyell's illustration of Granny settled on a limpet
- Species: Actinia equina
- Born: c. 1821 discovered in 1828, North Berwick, Scotland
- Died: 4 August 1887 (aged c. 66); Royal Botanic Garden Edinburgh
- Known for: Scientific and social celebrity; longevity
- Owners: John Dalyell, John Fleming, James M'Bain, John Sadler and Robert Lindsay
- Offspring: Several hundred

Granny was the affectionate name eventually given to a beadlet sea anemone, Actinia equina, which in 1828 was taken from a rocky shore at North Berwick in Scotland by an amateur naturalist, John Dalyell. During her long life through the Victorian era, she was cared for by a series of Edinburgh naturalists. Long outliving Dalyell, this sea anemone lived alone in a jar where she gave birth to several hundred offspring before her death in 1887.

Dalyell investigated and was puzzled by how Granny was producing her young, and, even in the 21st century, the processes involved are not well understood by zoologists.

Granny was shown to many visitors, some very distinguished, and her visitors' book held over a thousand names. She was the topic of several talks at scientific conferences, where she sometimes accompanied the speaker. Two educational children's stories were written about her in the didactic style typical of the era.

She became well known during her lifetime, becoming "arguably the most famous and celebrated cnidarian of all time".

== Early life ==
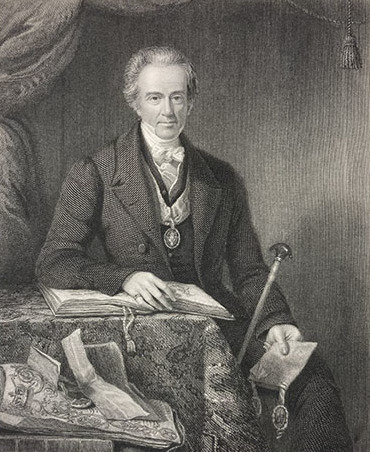
John Graham Dalyell

This specimen of an Actinia equina sea anemone was found on the shore at North Berwick in 1828 by the lawyer, antiquarian and naturalist John Graham Dalyell. Dalyell, who collected sea creatures, thought it appeared to be about seven years old when he came across it. Beadlets are commonly found on rocky north-east Atlantic coasts. (Note: The specimen was possibly of the morph known as "strawberry anemone" which was long regarded as a variety of Actinia equina (also called Actinia mesembryanthemum in Dalyell's day). The strawberry anemone is now usually regarded as a separate species from the beadlet.) Eventually in 1848 Dalyell, who by this time had been knighted and had inherited a baronetcy, described and illustrated it, calling it Actinia mesembryanthemum, in his two-volume book Rare and Remarkable Animals of Scotland, represented from Living Subjects, which concentrated on sessile marine creatures. He did not name the creature, simply referring to it as "the specimen of Plate XLV".

The beadlet was reddish-brown when it was first taken but twenty years later it had become a dull greenish colour with blue tubercules at the base of the outer row of tentacles. There were three rows of tentacles with the fewest and longest in the inner row. Over time the number of tentacles increased, reaching 100 after 20 years. In 1860 it was described as being pale brown in colour and "no larger than a half-crown piece". (Note: From 1816 until 1970, just before decimalisation, the half crown was 32 millimetres (1.3 in) in diameter. Granny was alternatively described as being "not two inches in height and breadth" (5 cm).)

After Dalyell's death in 1851 the creature was cared for by Rev Prof John Fleming, followed by Dr James M'Bain, and latterly by John Sadler and then Robert Lindsay, both curators of the Royal Botanic Garden Edinburgh. (Note: The periods of custodianship were Dalyell 1829–1851; Fleming 1851–1857; M'Bain 1857–1879; Sadler 1879–1882 and Lindsay 1882–1887.)

== Personal life ==
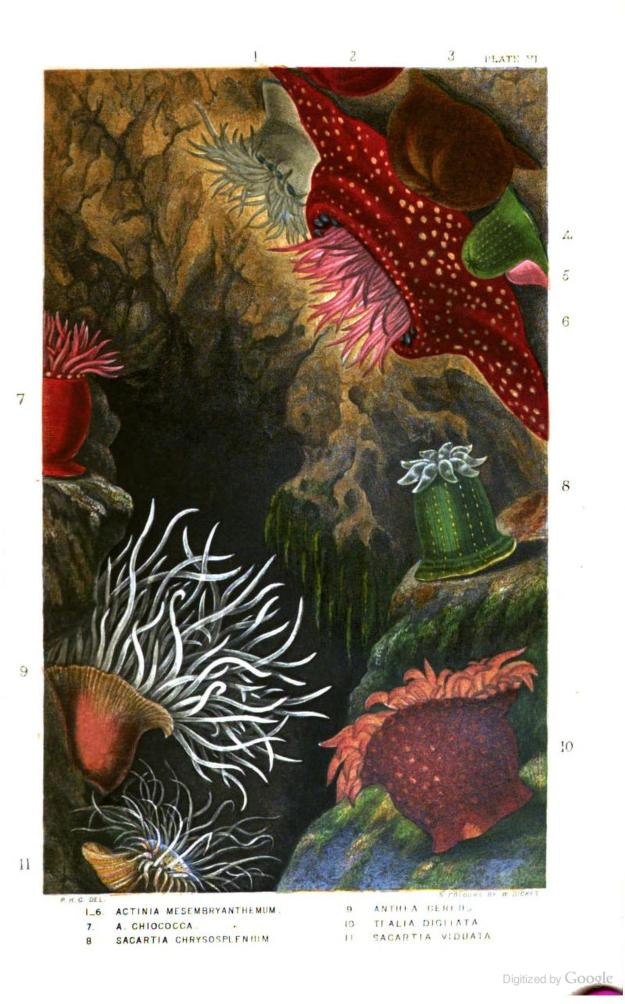
Gosse's 1860 illustration of sea anemones including Actinia at top (numbered 1–7)

Although Dalyell described the species as hermaphrodite, the particular specimen that became famous was generally regarded as female because she (Note: The pronouns "she" and "her" were generally used.) produced offspring. It was not understood at the time that beadlet sea anemones can be of female, hermaphrodite or male morphological types, sometimes changing at different stages of their lives, and all states can produce young. Despite this, there is no consistent evidence of sexual reproduction in Actinia equina. (Note: As of 2020 it could be said that A. equina is a species complex that broods its planula larvae (its offspring) internally. It is not certain whether A. equina reproduces solely asexually. If it sporadically reproduces sexually the larvae would probably be released into the sea from where they must return to an adult's cavity (not necessarily the parent's) to achieve metamorphosis into the adult stage. The species may lack some of the toolkit genes that would be necessary for sexual reproduction. It is not clear whether it is diploid. Further field and laboratory work is required to understand how the species reproduces.) In any case, after she had been caught Granny lived alone in a cylindrical glass jar, apart from brief periods with her newly born offspring. Under Dalyell's care she produced 334 young in 23 years and then none until 1857 when 240 offspring were born in one night. Next, in 1872, there were 30 born in August and 9 more in December. After that, although she produced young in most years, the numbers declined.

Although he was mystified how the embryos were being produced, Dalyell discovered that they developed for highly variable lengths of time in the gastrovascular cavity of the parent. Sometimes they moved temporarily into the parent's translucent tentacles where they could be more easily observed and they might also leave the parent's body cavity and return later. Ultimately, in a rare and brief event that was very difficult to observe, they were ejected individually or en masse out of the parent's internal cavity, in much the same way as for disgorging indigestible food matter. (Note: "Corpusculum" and "gemmule" were terms Dalyell often used for early stages of the embryo.)

It was often said that Dalyell changed the sea water in the beadlet's jar every day and had his porter fetch new water from the sea at least three times a week but Dalyell's sister said that the water, which was carried in a 3 to 4 gallon (14–18-litre) earthenware jug, might often be changed twice a day. Later, M'Bain fed Granny on half a mussel once a month whereas Dalyell had supplied more frequent and varied meals.

In 1861 John Harper wrote about her in detail, calling her by the name of Granny, and in 1866 Adam White produced a didactic story for children setting her life alongside events in world history. (Note: Granny was at this stage given the name merely because of her age and it was only in 1878 and 1879 that there were reports of her offspring themselves giving birth. White actually called her "Grannie".) Professor D'Arcy Wentworth Thompson also wrote about her for children saying that when he was a boy he "knew her [...] well and intimately, and helped to feed her". He had also been allowed to keep some of her offspring from two generations.

== Career ==
Granny was not shown in public while she was in Dalyell's care but in 1859 James M'Bain took the beadlet to an Aberdeen meeting of the British Association and to the Medico-Chirurgical Society of Edinburgh in 1872. In 1878 he spoke at the 107th session of the Royal Physical Society of Edinburgh taking Granny and specimens of two generations of her young to show the audience. He said:

This celebrated specimen is well known in the world of science, as also to a wide circle of non-scientific friends; and a portion of its domestic life has been recorded by several eminent writers on natural history both at home and abroad. The familiar name of "Granny" has been conferred on it, to which it has long been well entitled...

— M'Bain (1878), pp. 281–282

Near the start of Granny's career White had written in 1866 "An Austrian knight from Vienna paid his respects to Grannie in 1865, and has alluded to her in a learned paper printed in 'High Dutch'". From September 1879 Sadler maintained a visitors' book for Granny extending over nearly eight years – this had over a thousand signatories including the Lord High Commissioner to the Church of Scotland and "distinguished professors and travellers". In 1881, as part of the celebrations welcoming the appointment of a new Lord High Commissioner, Granny was introduced to Lord Aberdeen, and his wife Lady Aberdeen. (Note: At the time of this audience one account says Granny had occupied the same glass jar for 52 years.)

D'Arcy Thompson gave the 1918 Royal Institution Christmas Lecture on the subject "The Fish of the Sea" and The Times reported that the hero of the lecture was Granny. (Note: Verbatim the Times reported that "The hero of the lecture, however, was neither jelly-fish nor hydra but a sea anemone. Heroine would be the better word, since the name the creature went by was 'Granny.'")

== Death ==
Granny died on 4 August 1887 but the news was embargoed until 11 October 1887, "apparently for State reasons", when The Scotsman published a lengthy obituary, "In Memoriam – 'Granny'", saying "while surrounded by several of its offspring [...] 'Granny' succumbed, being known to have lived sixty-seven years". (Note: Swinney supposes that the news might have been thought sufficiently distressing to mar the celebrations of Queen Victoria's golden jubilee.) On 2 November The New York Times reported the matter but it took until 28 December, by which time the death seems to have assumed a lesser importance, for the Southland Times of New Zealand to announce the "Death of a Nondescript Celebrity".

White had predicted that Granny's resting place would be in a jar of alcohol in a museum but it seems her remains were not preserved. However, Thompson wrote that her Scotsman obituary rightly showed that she was "famous and was mourned by a great circle of friends". Swinney considered she had become, and remained, "arguably the most famous and celebrated cnidarian of all time". The Royal Botanic Garden Edinburgh still keeps an archive of papers about her.

== Granny as a "pioneer" in Victorian era Britain ==
Granny's significance extended beyond scientific and social circles. The 1887 article in The Scotsman claimed she was "the pioneer of the new movement in popular education", obliquely crediting her for influencing the British fashion for aquariums in drawing rooms of the Victorian era.

"The Aquarium", 1879

From 1790 Dalyell had led the way in keeping marine creatures and had kept an Actinia sea anemone as early as 1805, which by 1807 had produced three young. He needed to replenish the sea water frequently because at that time the need to oxygenate the water was not understood.

In early Victorian Britain the middle-class fashion for ferns kept in glass cases began to wane by the 1850s. In 1854 Philip Henry Gosse published his book The Aquarium: an Unveiling of the Wonders of the Deep Sea (Gosse devised the word "aquarium") which described two developments that made it easier to keep sea water creatures in a domestic setting. Taking his idea from the cases for ferns, he proposed a rectangular box design of tank which could be made at home and which soon became available commercially. He also explained the vital importance of having seaweed or aquatic plants to keep the water aerated and reduce the need for fresh supplies of seawater.

Gosse did not personally discover the need for seaweed or seagrass (Note: The underlying scientific principle was discovered by Robert Warington in 1850.) but he was the first to popularise the idea. His book became a best seller and made a profit of £900 (equivalent of £86,000 in 2025). Families who were now able to go on holiday by train could bring back seaweed and sea anemones which were easily caught and were attractive at home in the drawing room. (Note: A hammer and chisel were recommended for obtaining both seaweed and sea anemones.) Having an aquarium had become a fad:

An Aquarium-mania seized upon the public mind. The Aquarium was on everybody's lip. The Aquarium rang in everybody's ear. Morning, noon, and night, it was nothing but the Aquarium.

— Henry D. Butler, The Family Aquarium (1858)

Professor Butler was American, one of the proprietors of Barnum's American Museum and, in 1859, Boston Aquarial Gardens, but he was writing of Britain. He went on wisely to say "It could not be expected that such a novelty would long escape the vigilant gaze of American enterprise".

The craze faded and during the 1870s there was a boom in building large public aquariums and, along with the museums being constructed at the same time, these were regarded by high-minded Victorians as worthy ways to educate the public. So, Granny was seen as pioneering a commendable educational movement although for almost sixty years she spent practically all her life alone in a simple jar without seaweed.

== See also ==
- Granny (orca)
- Paul the Octopus
