= FAM216A =

Protein-coding gene in humans

Identifiers
- Aliases: FAM216A, C12orf24, HSU79274, family with sequence similarity 216 member A
- External IDs: MGI: 1916198; HomoloGene: 8328; GeneCards: FAM216A; OMA:FAM216A - orthologs

Gene location (Human)
Chr.	Chromosome 12 (human)
Band	12q24.11	Start	110,468,415 bp
Band	12q24.11	End	110,490,385 bp

Gene location (Mouse)
Chr.	Chromosome 5 (mouse)
Band	5|5 F	Start	122,502,643 bp
Band	5|5 F	End	122,510,427 bp
RNA expression pattern
Bgee	Human / Mouse (ortholog); Top expressed in: left testis; right testis; cerebellar hemisphere; right hemisphere of cerebellum; Brodmann area 9; gonad; prefrontal cortex; right frontal lobe; hypothalamus; nucleus accumbens / Top expressed in: spermatocyte; saccule; seminiferous tubule; spermatid; otic placode; ventricular zone; otic vesicle; medial ganglionic eminence; superior frontal gyrus; endocardial cushion; More reference expression data
BioGPS	n/a
Orthologs
Species	Human	Mouse
Entrez	29902	68948
Ensembl	ENSG00000204856	ENSMUSG00000029463
UniProt	Q8WUB2	Q9DB54
RefSeq (mRNA)	NM_013300	NM_026883
RefSeq (protein)	NP_037432	NP_081159
Location (UCSC)	Chr 12: 110.47 – 110.49 Mb	Chr 5: 122.5 – 122.51 Mb
PubMed search
- Wikidata
View/Edit Human	View/Edit Mouse

FAM216A family with sequence similarity 216 member A is a protein that in humans is encoded by the FAM216A also known as the C12orf24 (Chromosome 12, open reading frame 24) gene. This gene is primarily expressed in the testis and brain, but has constitutive expression in 25 other tissues. FAM216A is an intracellular protein that has been predicted to reside within the nucleus of cells. The exact function of FAM216A is unknown. FAM216A is highly expressed in Sertoli cells of the testis as well as different stage spermatids.

== Gene ==
=== Locus ===
FAM216A is a protein-encoding gene found on the forward strand of chromosome 12 at the locus 12q24.11. FAM216A is located on the long arm of chromosome 12.

=== mRNA ===
FAM216A has 2 isoforms X1 and X2 that are both shorter than the main protein, which is known as FAM216A. Isoform X2 has 2 variants which are the same length and isoform X1 only has 1 variant.

Name	Transcript ID	Base pair length	Protein length
FAM216A	NP_037432.2	1,101	273
FAM216A_X1	XP_011536548.1	1,148	234
FAM216A_X2	XP_024304727.1	1,142	179
FAM216A_X2	XP_005253932.1	1,040	179

=== Size ===
Chromosome 12 is a medium-sized chromosome, on which FAM216A spans from 110,468,415 to 110,490,387 which is 21,973 bases long. The resulting mRNA transcript is 1,101 bases, 822 of which is the coding sequence. The resulting protein is 273 amino acids long.

Exon	Start	End	Length in base pairs
ENSE00001474815	110,468,845	110,469,018	174
ENSE00003514548	110,473,078	110,473,077	41
ENSE00003459833	110,485,078	110,485,199	122
ENSE00003639607	110,486,325	110,486,454	130
ENSE00003553453	110,486,534	110,486,717	184
ENSE00003571489	110,487,861	110,487,943	83
ENSE00003568139	110,490,019	110,490,385	367

=== Expression ===
FAM216A is primarily expressed in the brain, spinal cord, and testis of humans. Within the testis FAM216A is expressed in Sertoli cells. Within the brain FAM216A is expressed within neuropils.

== Gene regulation ==
=== Promoter ===
According to the UCSC Genome Browser and Genomatix Eldorado there are two promoters of FAM216A and no enhancers or other regulatory elements. Only one of the two predicted promoters binds transcription factors.

=== Transcription factors ===
There are many transcription factors predicted to bind to the promoter region of FAM216A by Genomatix and the UCSC Genome Browser.

Name	Function	Binding sequence
ZKSCAN3	C2H2 zinc finger transcription factors 2	ccctcCCCCaccgtaactccggg
SPZ1	Testis-specific bHLH-Zip transcription factors	aGGAGggaaat
WT1	Wilms tumor suppressor	cggtgggGGAGgggcagga
E2F7	Cell cycle regulator	cacaggaGGGAaatata
MZF1	Myeloid zinc finger 1 factors	gcGGGGagcag
ETSF	Human and murine ETS1 factors	gtttgacaGGAAggtggctca
ZNF7	C2H2 zinc finger transcription factors 18	cgggaGGCTgaggca
NKX2	NKX homeodomain factors	gccctcAAGTgagaggcgg
MYOD	Myoblast determining factor	ctgggaCAGCtgctccc

== Protein ==
=== Cellular location ===
According to the PSORT program of Genescript, FAM216A is 69.6% likely to be a nuclear protein. NCBI Gene predicts that FAM216A is an intracellular protein.

=== Structure ===
Protein FAM261A has 2 charge runs, a positive run from amino acids 200-229 and a negative charge run from amino acids 238–268. Methionine, histidine, and serine are all seen at a higher than expected rate in FAM216A while valine is seen at a significantly lower than expected rate.

The CFSSP (Chou and Fassman Secondary Structure Prediction Server) predicts a secondary structure for FAM216A that has multiple alpha helices with a few large beta pleated sheets. I-TASSER structure prediction program shows a 3D structure of FAM216A that has many alpha helices and a few coil turns with no beta pleated sheets.

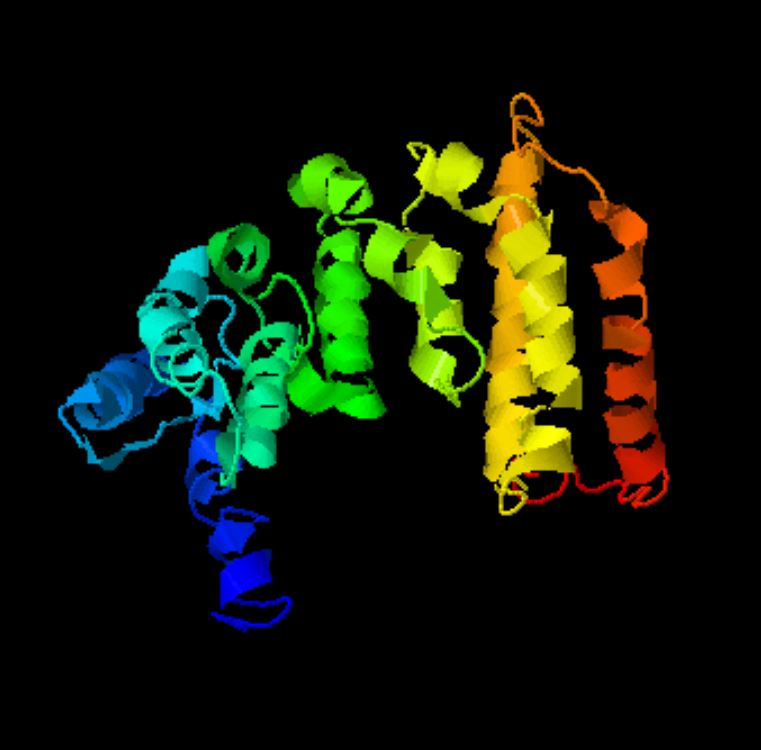
3D Structure of FAM216A

== Protein level regulation ==
There are 8 predicted sites of sumoylation on FAM216A, with only 2 of them having a high probability of occurrence. There are 7 predicted sites of glycation on FAM216A. There is no predicted signal peptide for FAM216A, which may prevent the protein from being glycosylated. There is 42 predicted sites for phosphorylation, however given the predicted structure of the protein not all 42 sites will be accessible for phosphorylation.

== Interacting proteins ==
There are only a few known proteins that are predicted to interact with FAM216A.

Protein	Function
E6	HPV type 8 protein that prevents apoptosis in infected cells
MAGEA10	Possible roles in embryonal development, tumor transformation, and tumor development
DKC1	Required for ribosome biogenesis and telomere maintenance
RCF4	Replication factor C subunit 4. Possible required for elongation of multiprimed DNA
CCDC34	Coiled-coil domain containing 34. Involved in the cell cycle
NIFK	Nucleolar protein interacting with the FHA domain of MKI67
PSMA4	Protease responsible for degrading most intracellular proteins

== Homology ==
=== Paralogs ===
The only paralog for FAM216A is FAM216B.

=== Orthologs ===
According to the NCBI Gene page for FAM216A, there are at least 182 organisms with an ortholog of FAM216A. The farthest back known orthologs are in sea corals which diverged from humans 824 million years ago.

Genus and species	Common name	Taxonomic group	Date of divergence (MYA)	Accession number	Sequence length	Sequence identity	Sequence similarity
Pan paniscus	Bonobo	Primate	6.7	XP_003832531	281	95.7	96.1
Pan troglodytes	Chimpanzee	Primate	6.7	PNI64720	256	92.7	93
Gulo gulo	Wolverine	Carnivore	96	VCW50183	254	79.9	86.6
Orcinus orca	Killer whale	Odontoceti	96	XP_004276778	256	78.8	84.2
Delphinapteruss leucas	Beluga whale	Odonoceti	96	XP_022453741	256	78.4	84.2
Mondon monoceros	Narwhal	Odontoceti	96	XP_029084711	256	78.4	84.2
Tursiops truncatus	Bottlenose dolphin	Odontoceti	96	XP_019806066	256	78.4	84.2
Callhorhinus ursinus	Northern fur seal	Carnivore	96	XP_025745569	253	77.7	85
Felis catus	House cat	Carnivore	96	XP_003994705	253	75.5	84.2
Puma concolor	Puma	Carnivore	96	XP_025789304	253	75.5	84.2
Acinonyx jubatus	Cheetah	Carnivore	96	XP_026899980	253	75.1	84.2
Equus asinus	Donkey	Equidae	96	XP_014714174	253	74.7	80.6
Camelus ferus	Wild Bactrian camel	Artidoctyla	96	XP_006178132	256	73.6	82.8
Loxodonta africana	African bush elephant	Proboscidea	105	XP_010598175	254	76.2	83.2
Ciona intestinalis	Sea vase	Tunicata	676	XP_002124486	268	16.9	28.9
Acanthaster planci	Crown-of-thorns starfish	Echinodermata	684	XP_022109834	368	17	29.7
Actinia tenebrosa	Australian red Waratah Sea anemone	Cnidaria	824	XP_031556553	433	16.1	24.8
Pocillopora damicornis	Cauliflower coral	Cnidaria	824	XP_027047953	415	16	23.7
Orbicella faveolata	Mountainous star coral	Cnidaria	824	XP_020623330	435	15.4	23.2
