= James McBain =

James McBain may refer to:

- James McBain (naturalist) (1807–1879), Royal Navy surgeon and naturalist
- James McBain (snooker player) (born 1978), British snooker player
- James Alexander McBain (1910–1988), Canadian member of Parliament
- James William McBain (1882–1953), Canadian chemist
- James McBain, musician known for the metal music project Hellripper
