= C11orf98 =

Protein-coding gene in the species Homo sapiens

Identifiers
- Aliases: C11orf98, C11orf48, chromosome 11 open reading frame 98
- External IDs: MGI: 1913526; HomoloGene: 84408; GeneCards: C11orf98; OMA:C11orf98 - orthologs

Gene location (Human)
| Chr. | Chromosome 11 (human) |
| Band | 11q12.3 | Start | 62,662,817 bp |
| Band | 11q12.3 | End | 62,665,210 bp |

Gene location (Mouse)
| Chr. | Chromosome 19 (mouse) |
| Band | 19|19 A | Start | 8,866,217 bp |
| Band | 19|19 A | End | 8,868,245 bp |
RNA expression pattern
| Bgee | Human / Mouse (ortholog); Top expressed in: mucosa of transverse colon; granulocyte; lymph node; substantia nigra; right adrenal gland; right testis; appendix; left testis; spleen; monocyte / Top expressed in: layer of retina; neural layer of retina; yolk sac; embryo; embryo; epiblast; proximal tubule; morula; placenta; lens; More reference expression data |
| BioGPS | n/a |
Orthologs
| Species | Human | Mouse |
| Entrez | 102288414 | 66276 |
| Ensembl | ENSG00000278615 | ENSMUSG00000071653 |
| UniProt | E9PRG8 | Q9D937 |
| RefSeq (mRNA) | NM_001286086 | NM_025463 |
| RefSeq (protein) | NP_001273015 | NP_079739 |
| Location (UCSC) | Chr 11: 62.66 – 62.67 Mb | Chr 19: 8.87 – 8.87 Mb |
| PubMed search |
- Wikidata
| View/Edit Human | View/Edit Mouse |

C11orf98 is a protein-encoding gene on chromosome 11 in humans of unknown function. It is otherwise known as c11orf48. The gene spans the chromosomal locus from 62,662,817-62,665,210. There are 4 exons. It spans across 2,394 base pairs of DNA and produces an mRNA that is 646 base pairs long.

== Gene ==
=== Expression ===
This gene is expressed at a very high level,4.4 times the average gene. The c11orf98 protein is expressed in a wide array of tissues. RNA-seq dat showed this gene to be expressed highest in the appendix, lymph node, and thymus.

An analysis via PSORT II concluded that the C11orf98 gene product is localized to the nucleus 82.6% reliability. This nuclear localization suggests that C11orf98 protein may have a function related to the expression and regulation of genes in the nucleus.

==== Regulation ====
Several different transcription factors are predicted to regulate the expression of the c11orf98 gene. These transcription factors were predicted based on DNA sequences found in the gene using Genomatix which also provided the name and description.

| # | Name | TF Description |
| 1 | V$ZIC3.03 | Zinc finger protein of the cerebellum (Zic3) |
| 2 | V$SPZ1.01 | Spermatogenic Zip 1 transcription factor |
| 3 | V$YB1.01 | Y box binding protein 1, has a preference for binding ssDNA |
| 4 | V$PAX5 | PAX5 paired domain protein |
| 5 | V$TCF21.02 | Transcription factor 21 |
| 6 | V$GFI1B.02 | Growth factor independence 1 zinc finger protein Gfi-1B |
| 7 | V$SPI1.02 | SPI-1 proto-oncogene; hematopoietic transcription factor PU.1 |
| 8 | V$ZKSCAN3.01 | Zinc finger with KRAB and SCAN domains 3 |
| 9 | V$EGR2.03 | Early growth response 2 |
| 10 | V$ZNF300.01 | KRAB-containing zinc finger protein 300 |
| 11 | V$AP4.03 | Activating enhancer binding protein 4 |
| 12 | V$AML2.01 | RUNX3 (Runt-related transcription factor 3), AML2 (Acute myeloid leukemia 2) |
| 13 | V$WHN.01 | Winged helix protein, involved in hair keratinization and thymus epithelium differentiation |
| 14 | O$DINR.01 | Drosophila initiator motifs |
| 15 | V$ZTRE.03 | 5' half site of ZTRE motif |
| 16 | V$ZNF35.01 | Human zinc finger protein ZNF35 |
| 17 | V$SP1.02 | Stimulating protein 1, ubiquitous zinc finger transcription factor |
| 18 | V$DMP1.02 | Cyclin D binding myb-like transcription factor |
| 19 | V$ETV1.02 | Ets variant 1 |
| 20 | V$WT1.02 | Wilms Tumor Suppressor |

== Protein ==
The c11orf98 gene encodes a protein that is 123 amino acids long. The predicted molecular weight of the protein is 14.2 kDa. The basal isoelectric point was determined to be 11.53. The protein's subcellular localization was predicted to be in the nucleus.

=== Domain ===
The c11orf98 protein contains a region of unknown function (DUF5564) that spans from amino acids 1-98. There are also 2 disordered regions within the protein that span from amino acids 1-21 and 32-123. C11orf98 contains 4 bipartite nuclear localization signals (NLS_BP) which indicates the protein will be 'tagged' for import into the cell nucleus by nuclear transport. The NLS_BP sequence usually consists of positively charged arginines, which would also explain the arginine rich region (ARG_RICH).

=== Structure ===
The secondary structures of the c11orf98 protein was predicted to have multiple alpha helices as well as beta sheets. The tertiary structure was predicted using AlphaFold

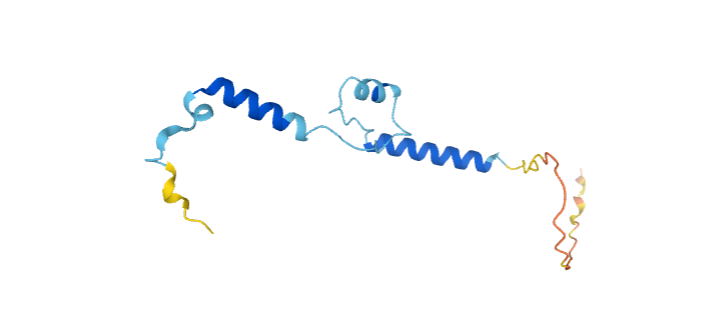
Alphafold predicted tertiary structure of c11orf98 protein

=== Post-translational Modifications ===
C11orf98 protein undergoes modifications following translation. The c11orf98 protein was predicted to have an amidation site. This functions as an active peptide precursor cleavage site. Next, a cAMP- and cGMP-dependent protein kinase phosphorylation site was predicted as well as other phosphorylation sites such as a Casein kinase II phosphorylation site and a protein kinase C phosphorylation site . An N-myristoylation site was predicted as well. Phosphorylation is significant because a phosphoryl group is added to the site, which only can occur in the nucleus or in cytosol. Myristoylation is significant because a myristoyl group (fatty acid group) is added to the site which helps anchor the transmembrane protein or cytosolic protein to the membrane. There were twelve predicted o-beta-GlcNAc glycosylation sites. This is significant because this modification is exclusively found on nuclear and cytoplasmic proteins rather than membrane proteins and secretory proteins. One sumoylation site was predicted. Sumoylation is a post-translational modification involved in nuclear-cytosolic transport, transcriptional regulation, apoptosis, protein stability, response to stress, and progression through the cell cycle.

=== Interactions ===
| Abbreviated Name | Name | Basis of ID | Score | Description |
| JUN | C-jun | Proximity-dependent biotin identification | Various | c-Jun, in combination with c-Fos, forms the AP-1 early response transcription factor |
| FBL | Fibrillarin | Proximity-dependent biotin identification | Various | component of a nucleolar small nuclear ribonucleoprotein (snRNP) particle thought to participate in the first step in processing pre-ribosomal (r)RNA |
| ESR1 | Estrogen receptor 1 | Tandem affinity purification | 0.35 | activated by the sex hormone estrogen, is a transcription factor composed of several domains important for hormone binding, DNA binding, and activation of transcription |
| SCARB2 | Scavenger Receptor Class B Member 2 | Pull Down | 0.35 | protein is primarily found in the membrane of cellular structures called lysosomes, which are specialized compartments that digest and recycle materials |
| OAS3 | 2'-5'-Oligoadenylate Synthetase 3 | Pull Down | 0.35 | This enzyme is induced by interferons and catalyzes the 2', 5' oligomers of ATP |

== Homology and evolution ==
=== Orthologs ===
The c11orf98 gene has 148 orthologs. The oldest ortholog appeared in invertebrates. Other orthologs were found in birds, reptiles, amphibians, fish, and invertebrates.

| Seq # | C11orf98 | Genus, Species | Common Name | Taxonomic Group | Divergence Date (Million Years Ago) | Accession Number | Query Cover | Sequence Length (aa) | Sequence Identity (%) | Sequence Similarity (%) |
| 0 | MAMMALIA | Homo sapiens | human | Primates | 0 | NP_001273015 | 100 | 123 | 100 | 100 |
| 1 | | Pan Paniscus | bonobo (pygmy chimpanzee) | Primates | 6.7 | XP_008952146.1 | 100 | 123 | 99.2 | 100 |
| 2 | | Mus musculus | house mouse | Rodentia | 90 | NP_079739.1 | 100 | 123 | 82.93 | 91.1 |
| 3 | AVES | Dromaius novaehollandiae | emu | Aves | 312 | XP_025975290 | 96 | 200 | 35.6 | 43.4 |
| 4 | | Apteryx mantelli | North Island brown kiwi | Aves | 312 | XP_013806542 | 90 | 155 | 48.4 | 61.9 |
| 5 | REPTILIA | Chelydra serpentina | comman snapping turtle | Reptilia | 312 | KAG6938024.1 | 97 | 127 | 62.2 | 74 |
| 6 | AMPHIBIAN | Bufo bufo | common toad | Amphibian | 351.8 | XP_040265882.1 | 98 | 135 | 51.5 | 75 |
| 7 | | Ranitomeya imitator | mimic poison frog | Amphibian | 351.8 | CAF5124592.1 | 59 | 97 | 51.2 | 56.6 |
| 8 | FISH | Danio rerio | zebrafish | Actinoptergyii (bony fish) | 435 | XP_009298201.1 | 65 | 177 | 33.7 | 43.7 |
| 9 | | Perca flavescens | yellow perch | Actinoptergyii (bony fish) | 435 | XP_028427042.1 | 97 | 129 | 58.3 | 71.2 |
| 10 | | Rhincodon typus | whale shark | Chondrichthyes | 473 | XP_020392632.1 | 95 | 125 | 59.1 | 73.2 |
| 11 | | Carcharodon carcharias | great white shark | Chondrichthyes | 473 | XP_041069108.1 | 95 | 130 | 57.6 | 74.2 |
| 12 | | Callorhinchus milii | elephant shark | Chondrichthyes | 473 | XP_007910732.1 | 61 | 134 | 47.1 | 63.6 |
| 13 | INVERTEBRATES | Styela Clava | stalked sea squirt | Chordata | 676 | XP_039269774.1 | 91 | 125 | 36.8 | 51.9 |
| 14 | | Branchiostoma belcheri | belcher's lancelet | Chordata | 684 | XP_019641031.1 | 93 | 127 | 39.9 | 55.8 |
| 15 | | Priapulus caudatus | penis worm | Priapulimorphida | 797 | XP_014677581.1 | 95 | 157 | 28.7 | 40.7 |
| 16 | | Owenia fusiformis | tubeworm | Polychaeta | 797 | CAC9620481.1 | 92 | 148 | 34.2 | 50 |
| 17 | | Lingula anatina | lingula | Brachiopoda | 797 | XP_013399665.1 | 69 | 141 | 35.2 | 55.6 |
| 18 | | Exaiptasia diaphana | sea anemone | Anthozoa | 824 | XP_020906605.1 | 78 | 110 | 30.6 | 52.4 |
| 19 | | Actinia tenebrosa | Waratah anemone | Anthozoa | 824 | XP_031558418.1 | 70 | 113 | 36.2 | 57.5 |
| 20 | | Nematostella vectensis | Starlet sea anemone | Anthozoa | 824 | XP_001639221.1 | 80 | 112 | 34.9 | 54 |

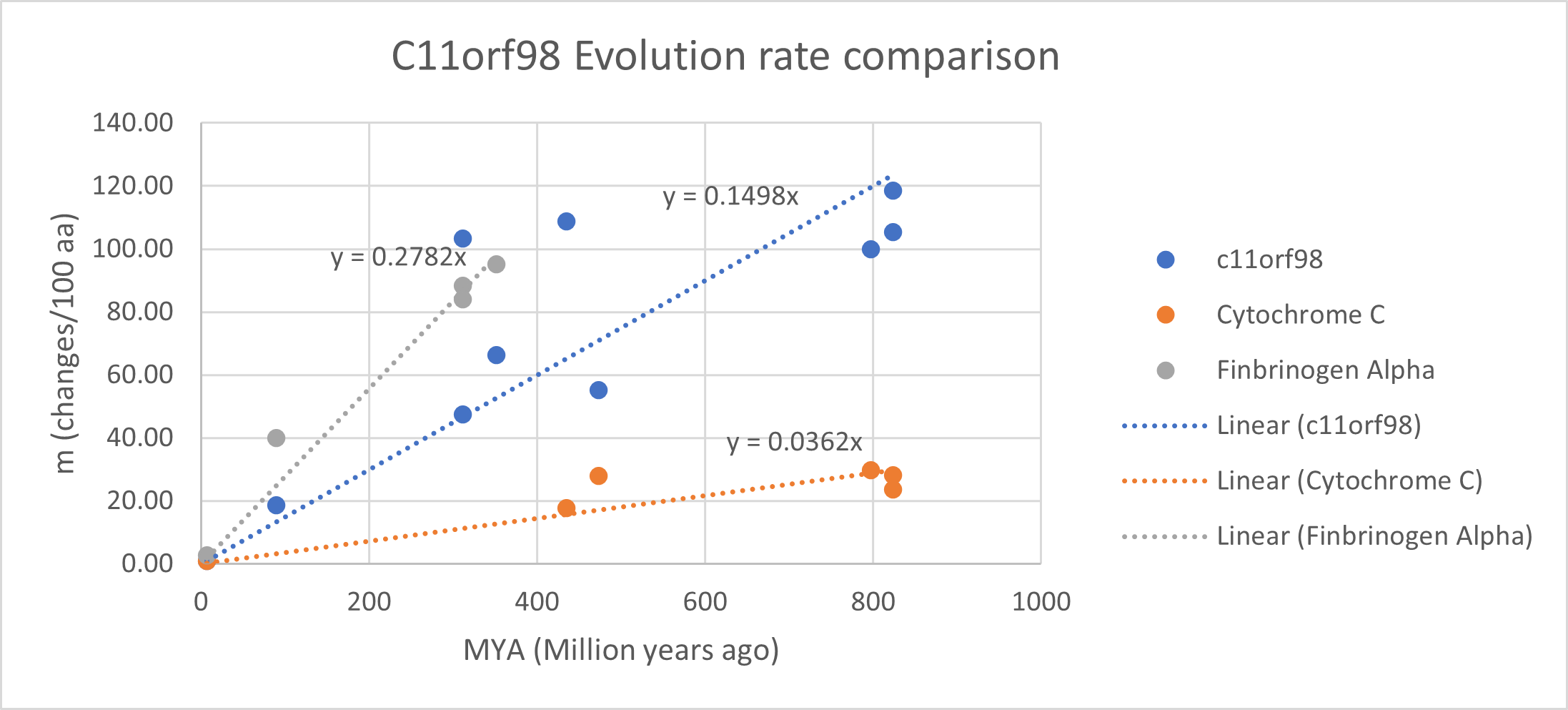
C11orf98's mutation rate compared to fibrinogen and cytochrome c.

=== Evolution rate ===
The relative evolution rate for c11orf98 is slower than the rate of fibrinogen alpha, but faster than cytochrome c. This is shown on the graph on the right

=== Phylogenetic tree ===
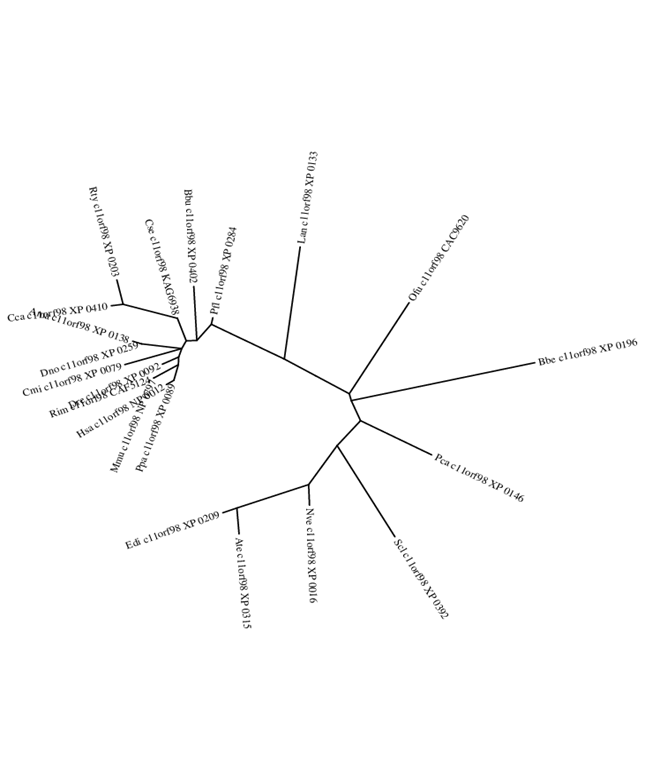
Unrooted phylogenetic tree of vertebrate and invertebrate c11orf98 orthologs

On the right is a phylogenetic tree displaying the evolutionary history of the gene.

== Clinical significance ==
Currently, the c11orf98 gene is not associated with any disease or medical condition.
