= Heteromorphosis =

Heteromorphosis (/ˌhɛt.ə.rəʊˈmɔrf.ə.sɪs/, /ˌhɛt.rə.-/) (Greek: έτερος – other; morphe – form) refers to situations where an organ or tissue is different from the expected, either because of (embryonic) development anomalies, or after reparative regeneration following a trauma. The difference include an abnormal location, or an abnormal shape. It should not be confused with homeosis, which means big change in tissue structure of an organ. Heteromorphosis is an example of the imperfection of some manifestations of the regenerative capacity.

Jacques Loeb offered this term in 1892, then he was in experiments of distortion of polarity of hydroids. Many organisms from protozoans to the chordate may have heteromorphosis examples, but it is easier to find in lower forms of animals:

- Earthworm: distortion of polarity: replacement of removed tail with head end
- Actinia: development of a cut into a second mouth
- Decapods: the replacement of removed eyes with antennae

== See also ==
- Epimorphosis
