= Jacques Loeb =

German-born American biologist (1859–1924)

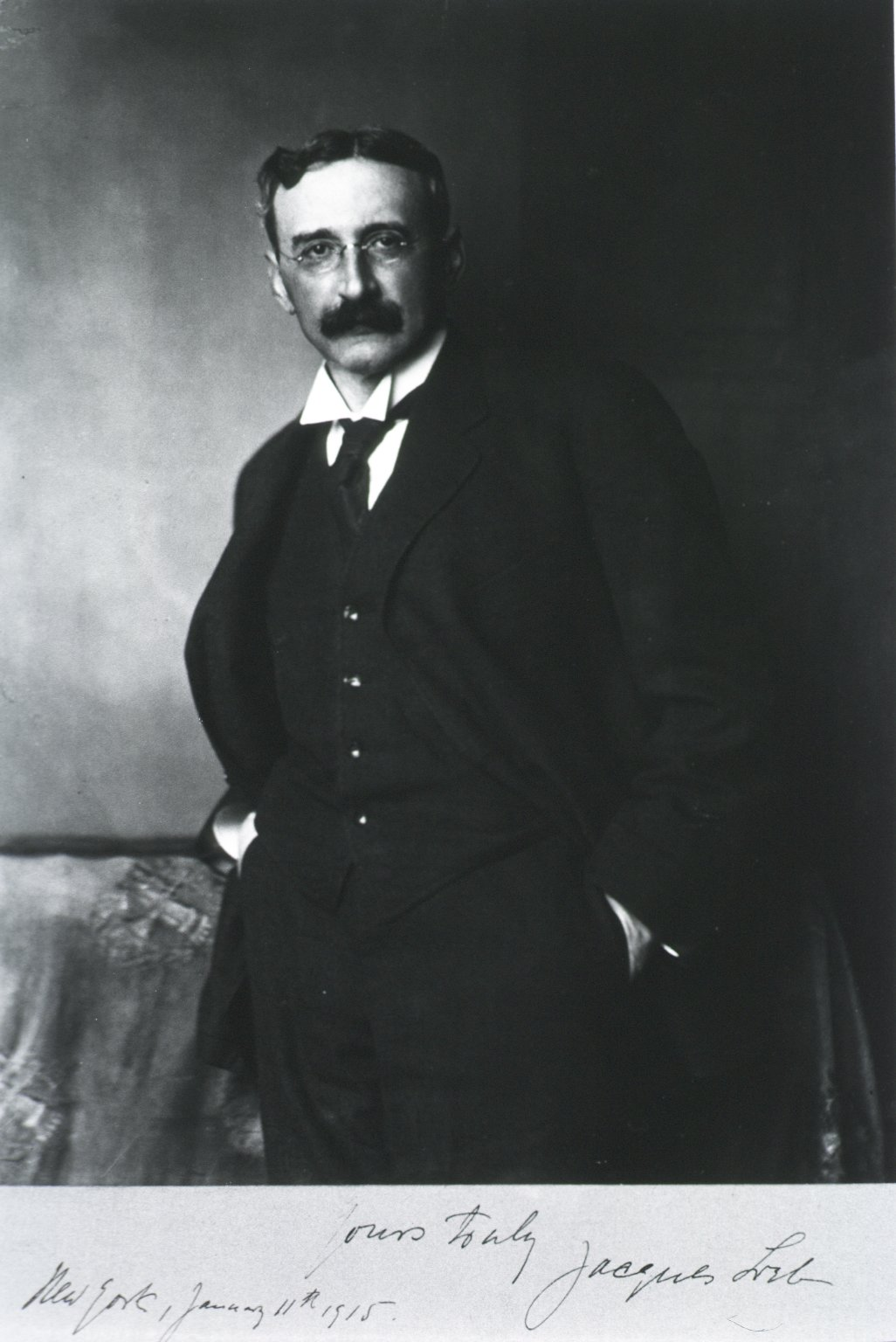
- Born: Itzak Loebe; April 7, 1859; Mayen, Rhine Province, Kingdom of Prussia
- Died: February 11, 1924 (aged 64); Hamilton, Bermuda
- Education: Friedrich Wilhelm University of Berlin, Ludwig-Maximilians-Universität München, University of Strasbourg
- Known for: Studies of embryonic development in marine invertebrates
- Children: Leonard Benedict Loeb
- Relatives: Leo Loeb (brother)
- Scientific career
- Fields: Physiology, biology
- Workplaces: Bryn Mawr College, University of Chicago, University of California, Berkeley, Rockefeller Institute for Medical Research

Jacques Loeb (/loʊb/; German: [løːp]; April 7, 1859 – February 11, 1924) was a German-born American physiologist and biologist.

== Biography ==
Jacques Loeb, born Itzak, firstborn son of a Jewish family from the German Eifel region, was educated at the Friedrich Wilhelm University of Berlin, the Ludwig-Maximilians-Universität München, and the University of Strasbourg (M.D. 1884). He took postgraduate courses at the University of Strasbourg and the Friedrich Wilhelm University of Berlin, and in 1886 became assistant at the physiological institute of the University of Würzburg, remaining there until 1888. In a similar capacity, he then went to the University of Strasbourg. During his vacations he pursued biological research, in Kiel in 1888, and in Naples in 1889 and 1890.

Loeb first arrived in the United States in 1891 when he accepted a position at Bryn Mawr College. The College, however, provided insufficient facilities for his work, leading to his resignation. In 1892, he was called to the University of Chicago as assistant professor of physiology and experimental biology, becoming associate professor in 1895, and professor of physiology in 1899. John B. Watson (the "father of Behaviorism") attended Loeb's neurology classes at the University of Chicago. He was elected a member to the American Philosophical Society in 1899. In 1902, he was called to fill a similar chair at the University of California, Berkeley. Loeb was among the professors who had summer homes on "Professors' Row", near the sea cliffs in Carmel, California; John Fleming Wilson called Carmel Point "Point Loeb" after him.

In 1910, Loeb moved to the Rockefeller Institute for Medical Research in New York, where he headed a new department. He remained at the Institute, now Rockefeller University, until his death. Loeb spent summers at the Marine Biological Laboratory in Woods Hole, Massachusetts, performing experiments on marine invertebrates. These included an experiment on artificial parthenogenesis. Loeb was able to switch the sea urchins' eggs to starting embryonic development without sperm. Modifications of the water in which the eggs were kept served as the stimulus for the development to begin. Later in 1918, Loeb established and became the first Editor of the Journal of General Physiology.

Jacques Loeb became one of the most famous scientists in America, widely covered in newspapers and magazines, influencing other important individuals in the scientific world such as B.F. Skinner. He was the model for the character of Max Gottlieb in Sinclair Lewis's Pulitzer-winning novel Arrowsmith, the first great work of fiction to idealize and idolize pure science. Mark Twain also wrote an essay titled "Dr. Loeb's Incredible Discovery", urging the reader not to support a rigid consensus, but to instead be open to new scientific advances.

Loeb was nominated many times for the Nobel Prize but never won.

Dr. Loeb was an atheist.

== Death ==
"Whatever we may individually think of the ultimate conclusions which he drew from his investigations, there can be but one opinion of Loeb's immense serviceability as an investigator. With his departure from our midst an immense intellectual force has been taken from the world and his disciples and those who disagree with him alike are permanently impoverished by its loss."
Prof. T. Brailsford Robertson (1926).

He died of coronary artery disease while vacationing in Bermuda in 1924.

== Research area ==
The main subjects of Loeb's work were:

- Animal tropisms and their relation to the instincts of animals
- Heteromorphosis, the replacement of an injured or removed organ by a different organ
- Toxic and antitoxic effects of ions
- Artificial parthenogenesis
- Hybridization of the eggs of sea-urchins by the sperm of starfish

== Works ==
Among Loeb's works the following may be mentioned:

- Der Heliotropismus der Thiere und seine Uebereinstimmung mit dem Heliotropismus der Pflanzen, Würzburg: Verlag von Georg Hertz, 1890.
- Untersuchungen zur physiologischen Morphologie der Thiere, Würzburg: Verlag von Georg Hertz, 1891–1892. 2 vols., vol. 1: Ueber Heteromorphose, vol. 2: Organbildung und Wachsthum.
- Einleitung in die vergleichende Gehirnphysiologie und vergleichende Psychologie, Leipzig: J. A. Barth, 1899. English ed., Comparative physiology of the brain and comparative psychology, New York: Putnam, 1900.
- Studies in general physiology, Chicago: The University of Chicago Press, 1905.
- The dynamics of living matter, New York: Columbia University Press, 1906.
- The mechanistic conception of life: biological essays, Chicago: The University of Chicago Press, 1912; reprint, Cambridge, Mass.: Harvard University Press, 1964.
- Artificial parthenogenesis and fertilization, translated from German by W. O. Redman King, reviewed and edited by Loeb. Chicago: The University of Chicago Press, 1913.
- The organism as a whole, from a physicochemical viewpoint, New York: Putnam, 1916.
- Forced movements, tropisms, and animal conduct, Philadelphia: Lippincott, 1918.
- Proteins and the theory of colloidal behavior, New York: McGraw-Hill, 1922.

The Mechanistic Conception of Life is Loeb's most famous and influential work. It contains English translations of some of his previous publications in German.

== Family ==
His younger brother Leo also immigrated to the United States where he became a noted pathologist.
