= Actinia mediterranea =

Scientific classification
- Kingdom: Animalia
- Phylum: Cnidaria
- Subphylum: Anthozoa
- Class: Hexacorallia
- Order: Actiniaria
- Family: Actiniidae
- Genus: Actinia
- Species: A. mediterranea

Binomial name
- Actinia mediterranea Schmidt, 1971

Synonyms
- Actinia equina mediterranea Schmidt, 1971; Actinia schmidti Monteiro, Sole-Cava & Thorpe, 1997

Species of sea anemone

Actinia mediterranea is a common sea anemone found on rocky shores all along its range in the Mediterranean Sea, Portuguese shores and the coast of north western Africa. Because of its strong resemblance with Actinia equina, they are often confused and share certain common names as Beadlet anemone.

== Description ==
Actinia mediterranea is a solitary anemone fixed on rocks with its cylindrical foot used as a suction pad. Underwater, this anemone displays a large number of short and retractable tentacles arranged in six concentric rows. The soft body is smooth and bright red with a fine blue border at the foot base. This characteristic blue border is a distinctive point to make the difference with Actinia equina, but size also can help as Actinia mediterranea is a bit larger (5 to 7 cm) than its close relative (3 to 5 cm).

== Habitat ==
Actinia mediterranea lives in the intertidal zone, fixed on rocks usually hidden from the direct sunlight, and can be found both in exposed and sheltered places. This anemone is highly adapted to hard living conditions and can tolerate tides, temperature and salinity variations and also desiccation. During low tide, the tentacles retract and the anemone resembles a compact blob of red like a small tomato.

== Biology ==
Actinia mediterranea leads a benthic way of life and is an active carnivore, catching its prey at night by displaying its stinging tentacles. Its diet consists in zooplankton, small fish, tiny crustaceans and organic detritus drifting in the water.

Even if the urticant power of its tentacles is relatively low and is not felt at the level of our hands, it is highly recommended to wash one's hands after having manipulated a species of Actinia because some urticant cells may stay on the hands and they constitute a risk of allergic reaction or burning sensations if a sensitive body part, such as eyelids or lips, get in contact with those residual cells.
