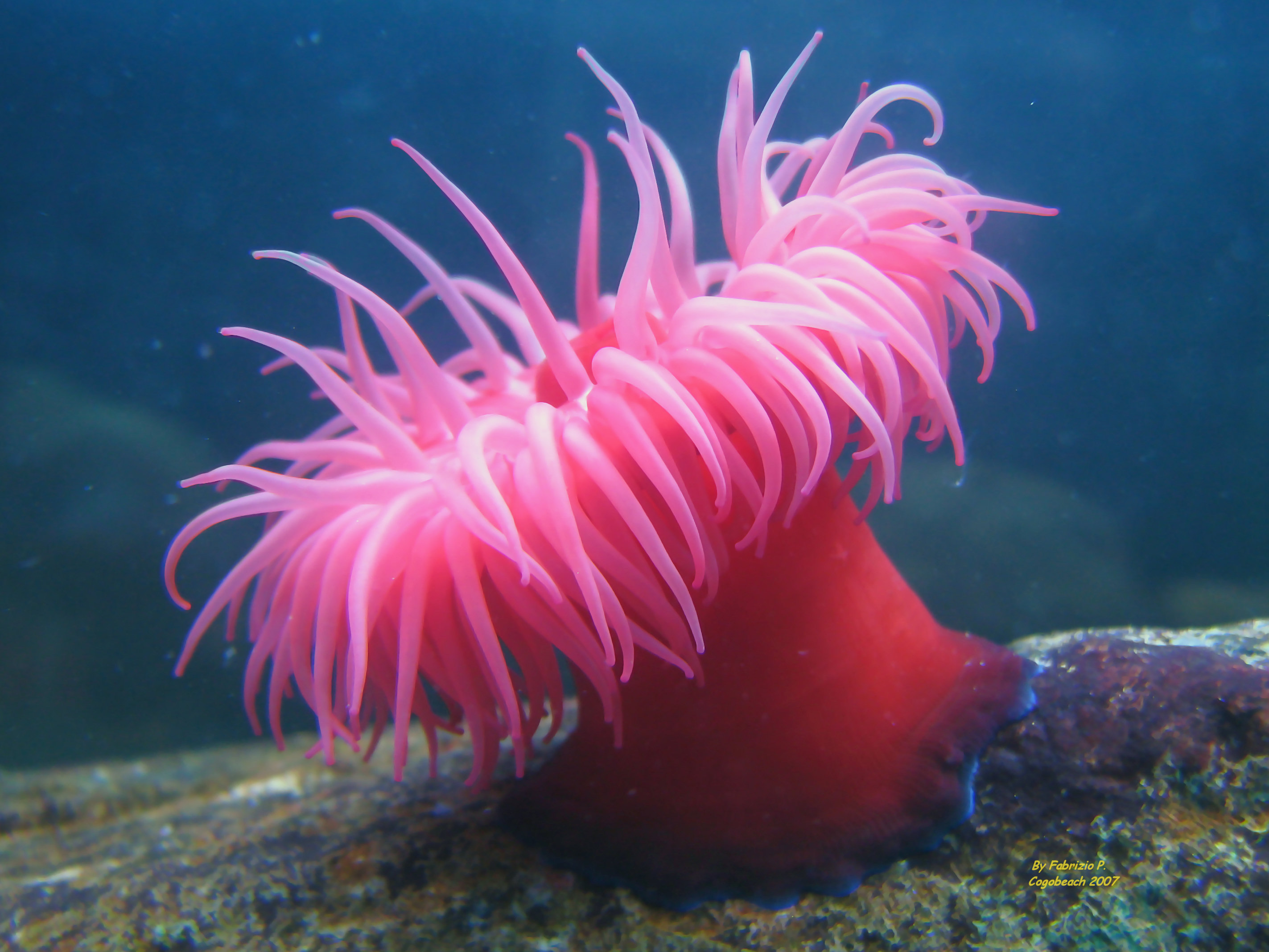
- Actinia equina

Scientific classification
- Kingdom: Animalia
- Phylum: Cnidaria
- Subphylum: Anthozoa
- Class: Hexacorallia
- Order: Actiniaria
- Family: Actiniidae
- Genus: Actinia; Linnaeus, 1767

Synonyms
- Actinea; Priapus Forsskål, 1775

= Actinia =

Genus of sea anemones

Actinia is a genus of sea anemones in the family Actiniidae. Actinia display a rare form of heteromorphosis in which a cut inflicted on a specimen can develop into a second mouth.

== Species ==
The following 63 species are listed in the World Register of Marine Species (WoRMS):

- Actinia alba Risso, 1826
- Actinia annulata Gay, 1854
- Actinia aster Ellis, 1768
- Actinia australiensis Carlgren, 1950
- Actinia bermudensis (McMurrich, 1889)
- Actinia bicornis Müller, 1776
- Actinia capillata Gay, 1854
- Actinia cari Delle Chiaje, 1822
- Actinia chlorodactyla Brandt, 1835
- Actinia cinerea Gay, 1854
- Actinia cleopatrae Hemprich & Ehrenberg, 1834
- Actinia curta Drayton in Dana, 1846
- Actinia delicatula (Hertwig, 1888)
- Actinia dubia Lesson, 1830
- Actinia ebhayiensis Schama, Mitchell & Solé-Cava, 2011
- Actinia equina Linnaeus, 1758
- Actinia erythrospilota Brandt, 1835
- Actinia fiscella Müller, 1789
- Actinia fragacea Tugwell, 1856, Strawberry anemone
- Actinia gelatinosa Moseley, 1877
- Actinia gemma Drayton in Dana, 1846
- Actinia gracilis Hemprich & Ehrenberg, 1834
- Actinia graminea Drayton in Dana, 1846
- Actinia grobbeni Watzl, 1922
- Actinia iris Müller, 1789
- Actinia kraemeri Pax, 1914
- Actinia laurentii Brandt, 1835
- Actinia mamillaris Quoy & Gaimard, 1833
- Actinia mediterranea Schmidt, 1971
- Actinia mertensii Brandt, 1835
- Actinia minutissima Le Sueur, 1817
- Actinia mucilaginosa
- Actinia nigropunctata den Hartog & Ocaña, 2003
- Actinia obtruncata Stimpson, 1853
- Actinia ornata Holdsworth, 1855
- Actinia ostraearum Gay, 1854
- Actinia papuana Quoy & Gaimard, 1833
- Actinia prasina Gosse, 1860
- Actinia punctata Gay, 1854
- Actinia pusilla Swartz, 1788
- Actinia reclinata Bosc, 1802
- Actinia rosea Risso, 1826
- Actinia rosula Ehrenberg, 1834
- Actinia rubida Holdsworth, 1855
- Actinia rufa Müller, 1776
- Actinia sali Monteiro, Sole-Cava & Thorpe, 1997
- Actinia sanguineo-punctata Templeton, 1841
- Actinia simplex Ehrenberg, 1834
- Actinia sinensis Andres, 1883
- Actinia striata Quoy & Gaimard, 1833
- Actinia striata Rizzi, 1907
- Actinia strigata Quoy & Gaimard, 1833
- Actinia tabella Drayton in Dana, 1846
- Actinia taeniata Gay, 1854
- Actinia tenebrosa Farquhar, 1898
- Actinia tilesii Milne Edwards, 1857
- Actinia timida Verrill, 1868
- Actinia tongana Quoy & Gaimard, 1833
- Actinia truncata Müller, 1776
- Actinia varians Müller, 1806
- Actinia violacea Risso, 1826
- Actinia volva Müller, 1776
- Actinia zonata Rathke, 1836
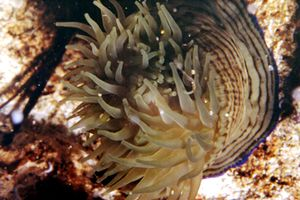
Actinia cari

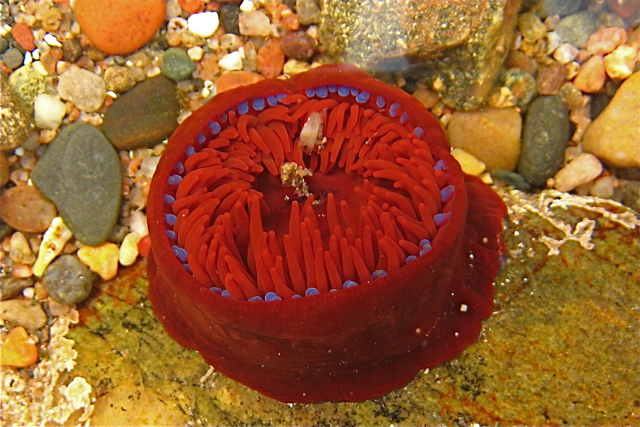
Actinia equina

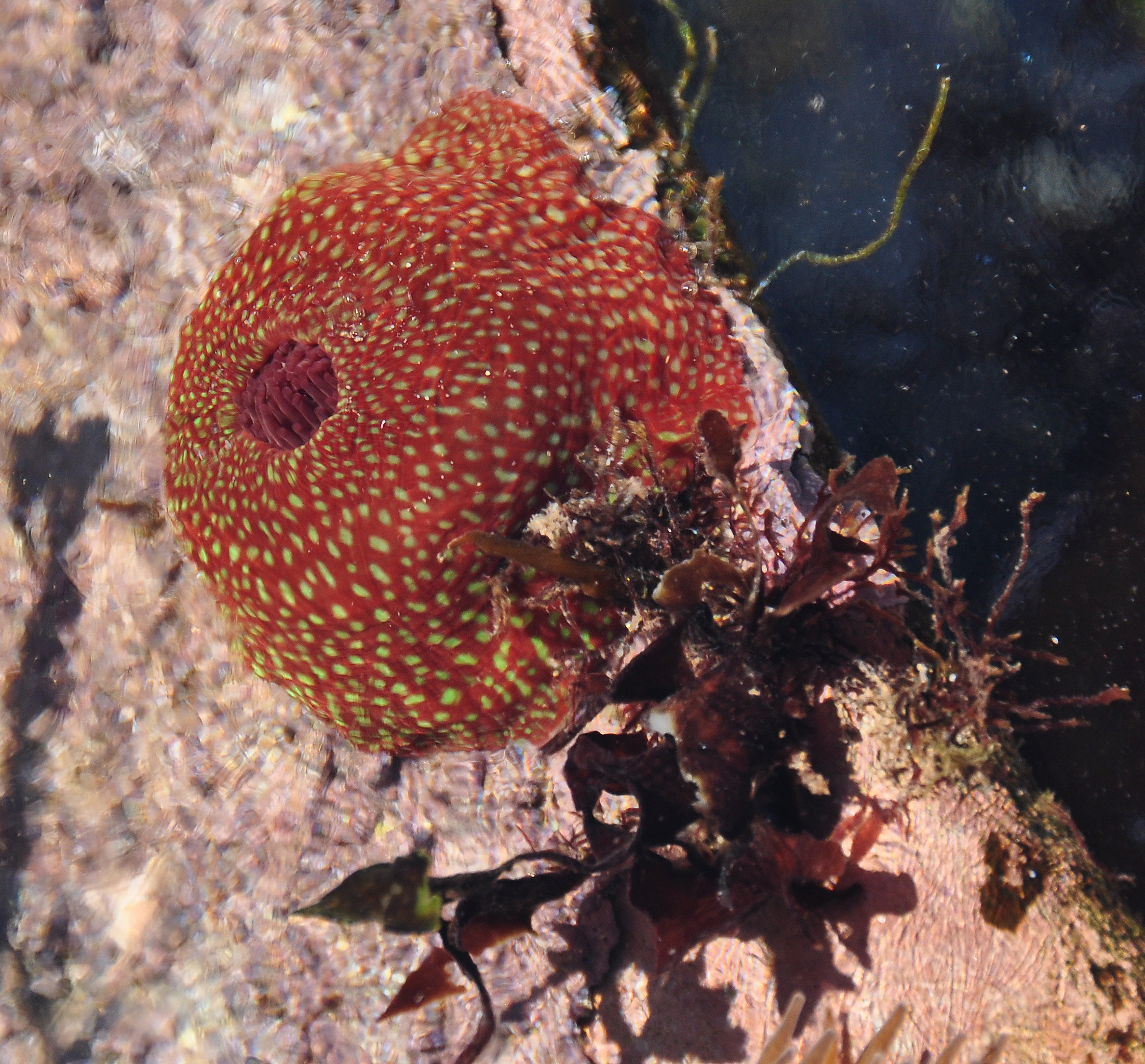
Actinia fragacea

Actinia mediterranea

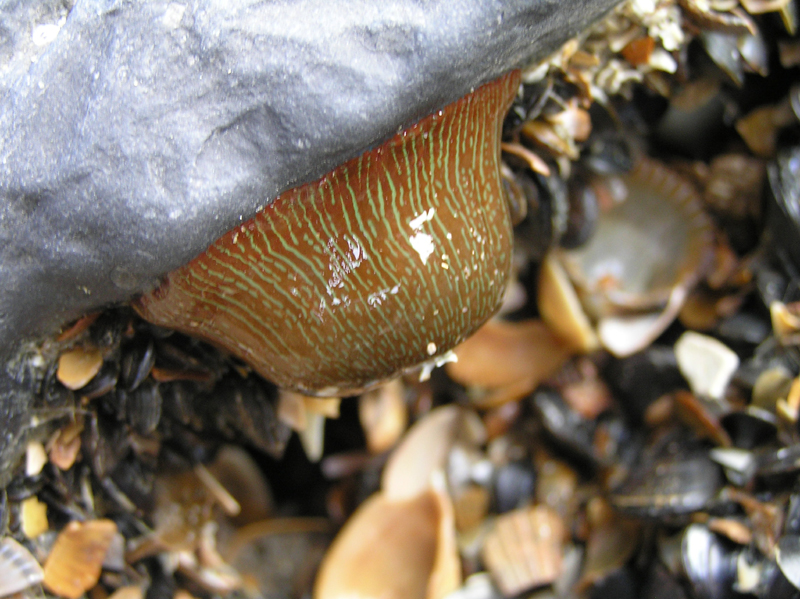
Actinia striata

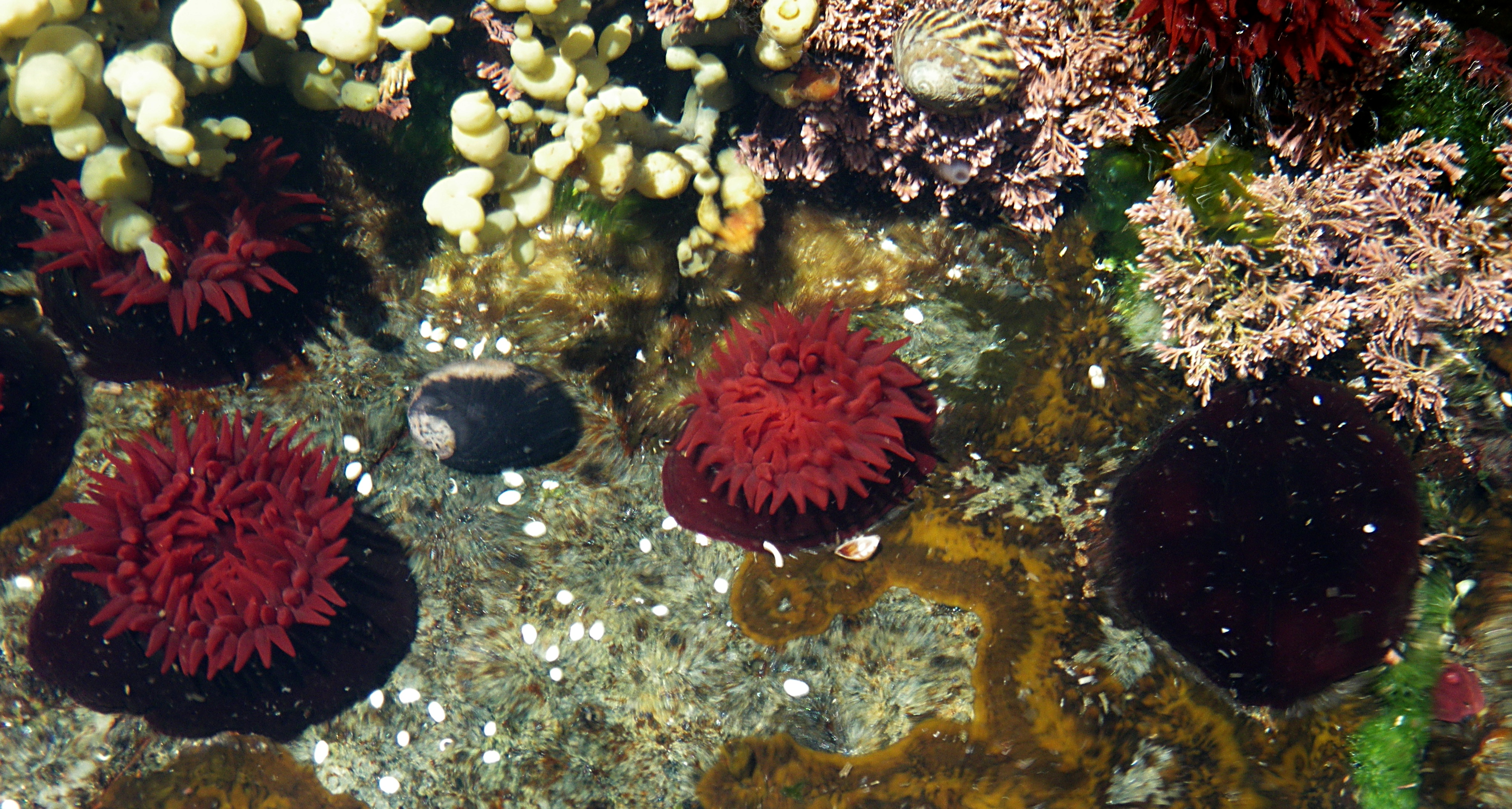
Actinia tenebrosa
