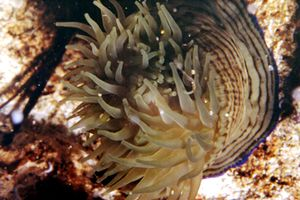

Conservation status
- Data Deficient (IUCN 3.1)

Scientific classification
- Kingdom: Animalia
- Phylum: Cnidaria
- Subphylum: Anthozoa
- Class: Hexacorallia
- Order: Actiniaria
- Family: Actiniidae
- Genus: Actinia
- Species: A. cari

Binomial name
- Actinia cari Delle Chiaje, 1822

= Actinia cari =

Species of sea anemone

Actinia cari is a species of sea anemone in the family Actiniidae. It is native to the Mediterranean Sea where it is an uncommon species.

== Description ==
Actinia cari grows to approximately 4-5 centimetres wide, and 8 centimetres high. It can fully retract its tentacles. It has a brown-green to reddish colour, with concentric, dark, longitudinal rings on the body wall, and is roughly cylindrical to conical in shape.

== Distribution and habitat ==
This is a common species that occurs mainly in the Mediterranean Sea, and can also be found in the adjacent parts of the Atlantic Ocean. Actinia cari lives in rocky areas, attaching itself to rocks and the underside of smooth stones. It is a common species and is found in the infralittoral zone and the subtidal zone to a depth of a few metres.

== Behaviour ==
This is a nocturnal species. It catches small prey with its tentacles.

== Venom ==
This sea anemone contains toxins that can be extracted by the "milking" method using gel and ion exchange chromatography. Two hemolytic polypeptides have been extracted in this manner. The two caritoxins, known as CTX I and CTX II, had a similar compositions of amino acids which did not include cysteine. The molecular weight of the pure toxin was found to be 19,800 daltons. The lethal dose (LD50) for mice injected intravenously, was found to be 54 μg/kg for CTX 1 and 90 μg/kg for CTX II. Another caritoxin, CTX III, has also been isolated using controlled autolysis of the tentacles through a nylon sieve, and separated using gel chromatography. This had a molecular weight in the range 20,000 to 25,000 daltons. The hemolytic activity of all three caritoxins was permanently and irreversibly inhibited by sphingomyelin.
