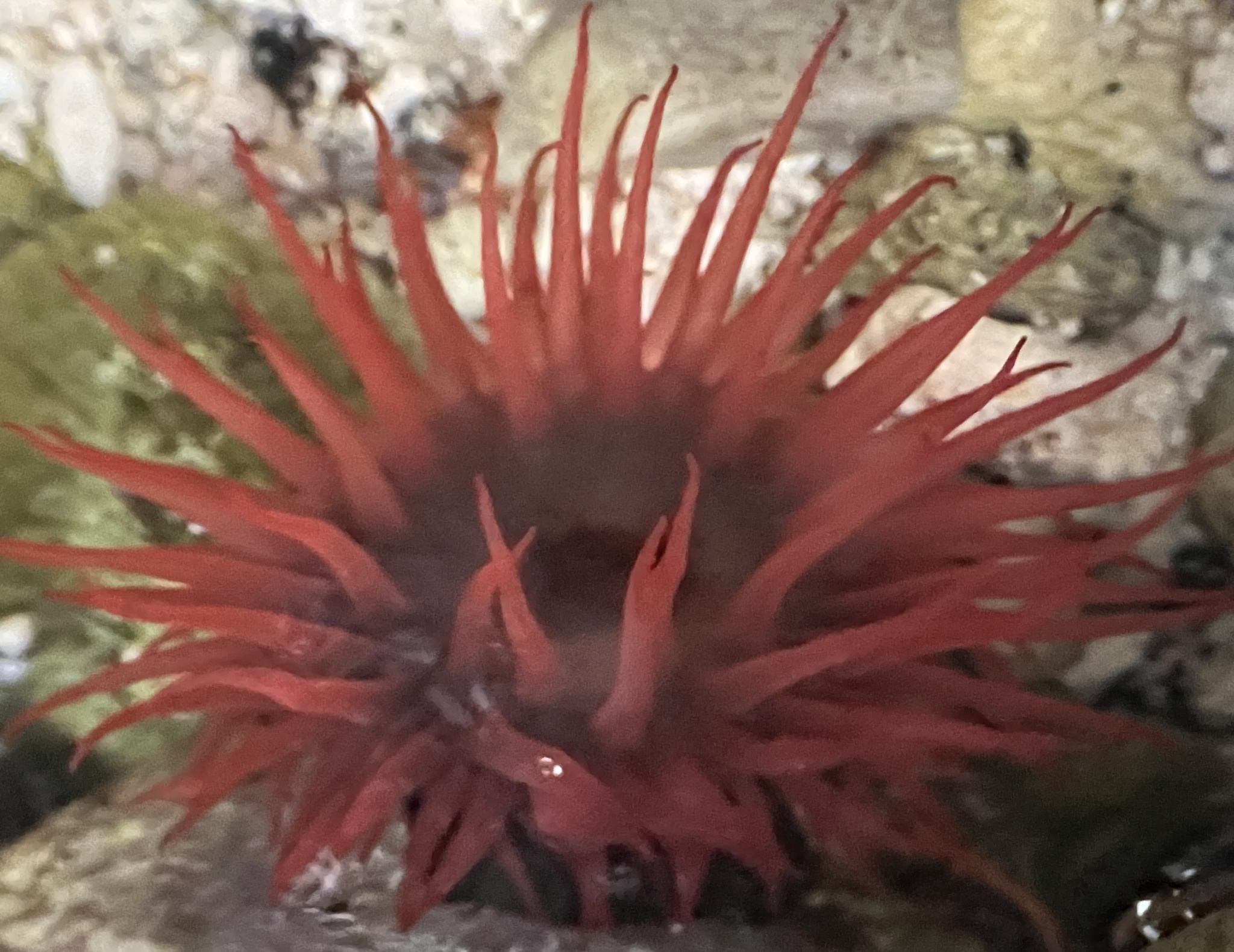

Scientific classification
- Kingdom: Animalia
- Phylum: Cnidaria
- Subphylum: Anthozoa
- Class: Hexacorallia
- Order: Actiniaria
- Family: Actiniidae
- Genus: Actinia
- Species: A. bermudensis

Binomial name
- Actinia bermudensis (McMurrich, 1889)

= Actinia bermudensis =

Species of sea anemone

Actinia bermudensis, the red, maroon or stinging anemone, is a species of sea anemone in the family Actiniidae.

== Description ==
Actinia bermudensis attaches itself to a rock surface by its pedal disc, which can reach 4 centimetres in width. The column is narrower at the top than the base and can reach 5 centimetres in height. Near the top is a ring of bulges called acrorhagi which contain many cnidocytes. The oral disc has a central mouth and two irregular whorls of 96 to 140 short, retractable, tapering tentacles which are armed with cnidocytes. The general colour of the anemone is dark red or maroon.

== Distribution and habitat ==
Actinia bermudensis occurs in the West Indies, Bermuda and northern Florida, Greece, Caribbean pool, West Atlantica and there is a further, isolated population off Brazil. It is found in the intertidal and the sublittoral zone. It is usually found near the base of rock walls, under overhangs, in caves, in crevices and under boulders.

== Biology ==
The acrorhagi of Actinia bermudensis are used to discourage other individuals from moving into the anemone's territory. Intruding anemones are not normally killed but usually retire to a safer place.

Actinia bermudensis is an omnivore. The main items of prey are gastropods, isopods and small bivalves. Other food items may include other marine invertebrates and algae.

Many sea anemones form a symbiotic relationship with zooxanthellae. Actinia bermudensis often contains these flagellate protozoa living within its tissues but they are of a non-photosynthetic species. It is doubtful whether this should be called symbiosis as the anemone does not seem to derive any benefit from the arrangement. At times of food scarcity, however, the anemone may consume the zooxanthellae.

Reproduction can take place by fission, the anemone splitting in half longitudinally. The offspring are clones of the parent and genetically identical. Alternatively, sexual reproduction occurs, with internal fertilisation. In this case the juvenile sea anemones are brooded by the parent in the gastrovascular cavity until they have grown sufficiently large to be liberated into the water column. There are ten times as many females among these brooded young as there are males. Another method of reproduction is a form of parthenogenesis with the young being brooded internally.
