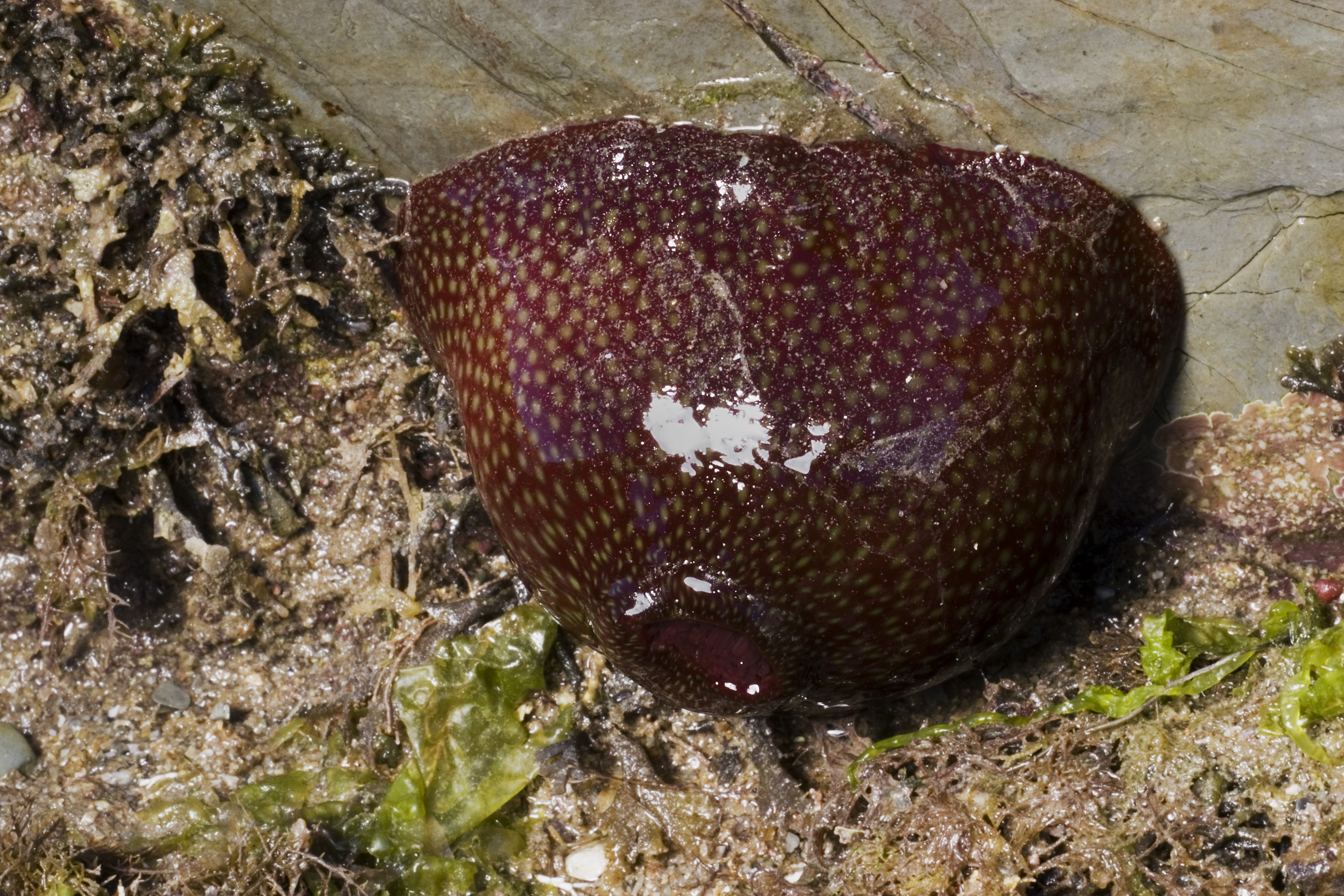
- Strawberry anemone (Actinia fragacea), the lower shore line at low tide, Lundy, Bristol Channel, UK.

Scientific classification
- Kingdom: Animalia
- Phylum: Cnidaria
- Subphylum: Anthozoa
- Class: Hexacorallia
- Order: Actiniaria
- Family: Actiniidae
- Genus: Actinia
- Species: A. fragacea

Binomial name
- Actinia fragacea Tugwell, 1856

= Actinia fragacea =

Species of sea anemone

Actinia fragacea, commonly known as the strawberry anemone, is a species of sea anemone of the order Actiniaria, that occurs from Norway to Africa, including adjacent islands (the Azores, Canary Islands, and Cape Verde) and the Mediterranean. It is generally found on rocks of the lower shoreline and depths up to 8–10 metres (26–33 ft).

== Description ==
The strawberry anemone has a smooth column which is typically red or dark red, with many greenish spots. The tentacles are usually red or purplish. Actinia fragacea is similar in form to the beadlet anemone (Actinia equina) and was at one time considered to be a variant of that species, however, it is typically larger, measuring up to 100 millimetres (3.9 in) across the base. It also has a conspicuous ring of pale blue, red, pink, or white spots known as "acrorhagi" around the inside of the top of the column.

== Distribution and habitat ==
The strawberry anemone is found in the northeastern and eastern Atlantic Ocean. Its range extends from Norway, England, Scotland, Wales, and Ireland to the Mediterranean Sea and North Africa, including the Azores, the Canary Islands, and Cape Verde. It occurs on the lower shore and sublittoral zone at depths generally less than 10 metres (33 ft). It is generally attached to rocks and boulders but is sometimes semi-immersed in sand.

A Californian species Corynactis californica shares the same common name, as does a southern African species, Corynactis annulata, and Urticina lofotensis, which is found in the North Atlantic Ocean and the Pacific coast of North America.

== Ecology ==
Little is known of the reproduction of this species but it has separate sexes and has an oviparous system of reproduction. It does not seem to brood its young. A particularly famous example of beadlet sea anemone, which was possibly a strawberry anemone, was that of "Granny" which was found on Scotland's east coast by John Dalyell in 1828 and who published a detailed early study of its behaviour.7.
