= Actinia ornata =

Actinia ornata is an unaccepted scientific name and may refer to two species of sea anemone:

- Sagartia elegans, found in coastal areas of north-western Europe
- Sagartia troglodytes, the mud sagartia, found in the north-eastern Atlantic Ocean, the North Sea and the Mediterranean Sea.
