= James McBain (naturalist) =

Scottish Royal Navy surgeon and marine biologist (1807–1879)

James McBain FRSE (1807-1879) was a Scottish Royal Navy surgeon and marine biologist. He served as President of the Royal Physical Society of Edinburgh 1861 to 1864.

== Life ==
McBain (his name was often given as James M'Bain) was born in Logie, Angus in 1807. He was educated at Kirriemuir Parish School then apprenticed to a local surgeon, aged 14.

Joining the Royal Navy in 1827 he was posted as Assistant Surgeon on the recently recommissioned HMS Undaunted. Here he served under Sir Augustus Clifford, sailing to India. This included taking Lord William Bentinck as a passenger to take up his role as Governor General. In 1831 the captainship transferred to Edward Harvey and included a trip to the Cape of Good Hope.

In 1832 McBain joined the survey ship HMS Investigator under Captain Barber, plying between London and Quebec.

He left the Navy in 1848 and bought a house in Elie in Fife before finally moving to Edinburgh in 1861. In Edinburgh he was elected a Fellow of the Royal Society of Edinburgh his proposer being fellow naturalist, John Hutton Balfour.

He died at home, Logie Villa (named after his birthplace) on York Road in Trinity, Edinburgh on 21 March 1879.
