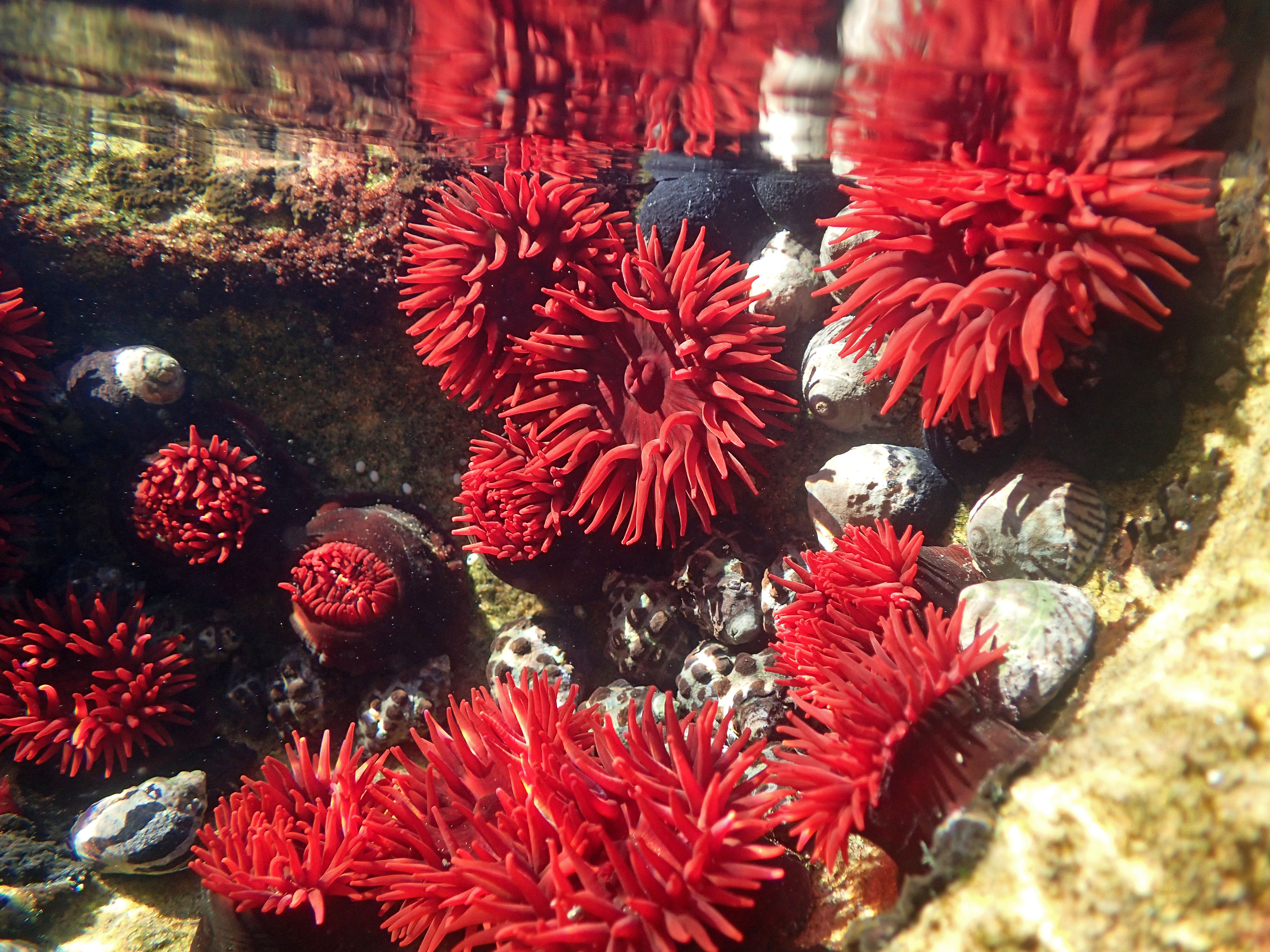

Scientific classification
- Kingdom: Animalia
- Phylum: Cnidaria
- Subphylum: Anthozoa
- Class: Hexacorallia
- Order: Actiniaria
- Family: Actiniidae
- Genus: Actinia
- Species: A. tenebrosa

Binomial name
- Actinia tenebrosa Farquhar, 1898

= Actinia tenebrosa =

Species of sea anemone

Actinia tenebrosa, commonly known as the waratah anemone, is the most common species of sea anemone found in the waters of eastern Australia and New Zealand (where it is known in Māori as kōtore, or kōtoretore). It is found relatively high on the seashore, in rock pools, and various cracks and shaded surfaces such as under rock overhangs in the intertidal zone.

== Description ==
When underwater, this sea anemone opens up to display numerous tentacles, arranged in three whorls. Out of water, the tentacles retract and the anemone closes to resemble a dome shaped red, crimson, brown, green or black blob of jelly, about 4 cm (1.6 in) across and 2.7 cm (1 in) high. While in a closed state, the anemone has a soft, ductile and jelly-like exterior. This species was first described in 1898 by H Farquhar who wrote "Full-grown individuals in situations well exposed to the rays of the sun have a column greenish or brownish black, and the disc and tentacles dusky crimson, while those on the undersides of overhanging stones are reddish brown or crimson, the depth of colour varying according to the amount of light which reaches them." Actinia tenebrosa is similar in form to the beadlet anemone (Actinia equina) of the northern hemisphere. The column has a number of iridescent blue spherules armed with nematocysts.

== Distribution and habitat ==
The waratah anemone is found along the coasts of southern Australia, its range extending from Perth to New South Wales. It is also found throughout New Zealand. It is found in cracks and crevices, under overhangs and under boulders on rocky shores, usually in the middle to low intertidal zone but occasionally higher up the shore.

== Biology ==
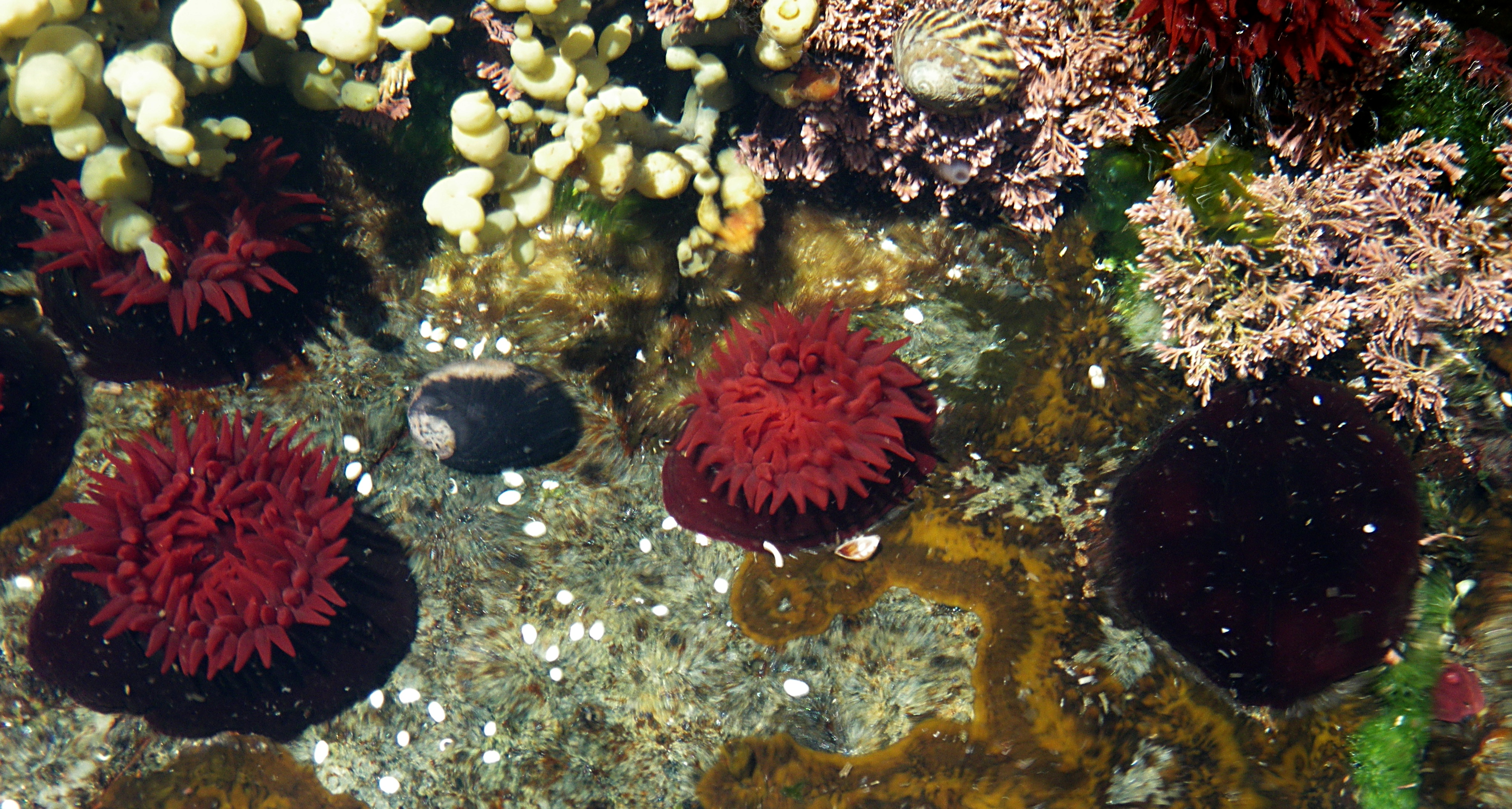
A. tenebrosa The anemone on the right is closed.

This species is viviparous and broods its young inside its body cavity. When the offspring are well-developed they are expelled through the mouth. The juveniles often attach themselves to rocks nearto the parent forming clonal clusters. When these anemones are growing alongside each other they appear to know whether or not they are closely related. If they are, they will tolerate each other's close presence, while if they are unrelated, they will attack each other. The waratah anemone can also reproduce sexually with planktonic larvae settling far away from the parent individual. It may be difficult for these juveniles to establish themselves because of resident populations of cloned individuals that are highly locally adapted.
