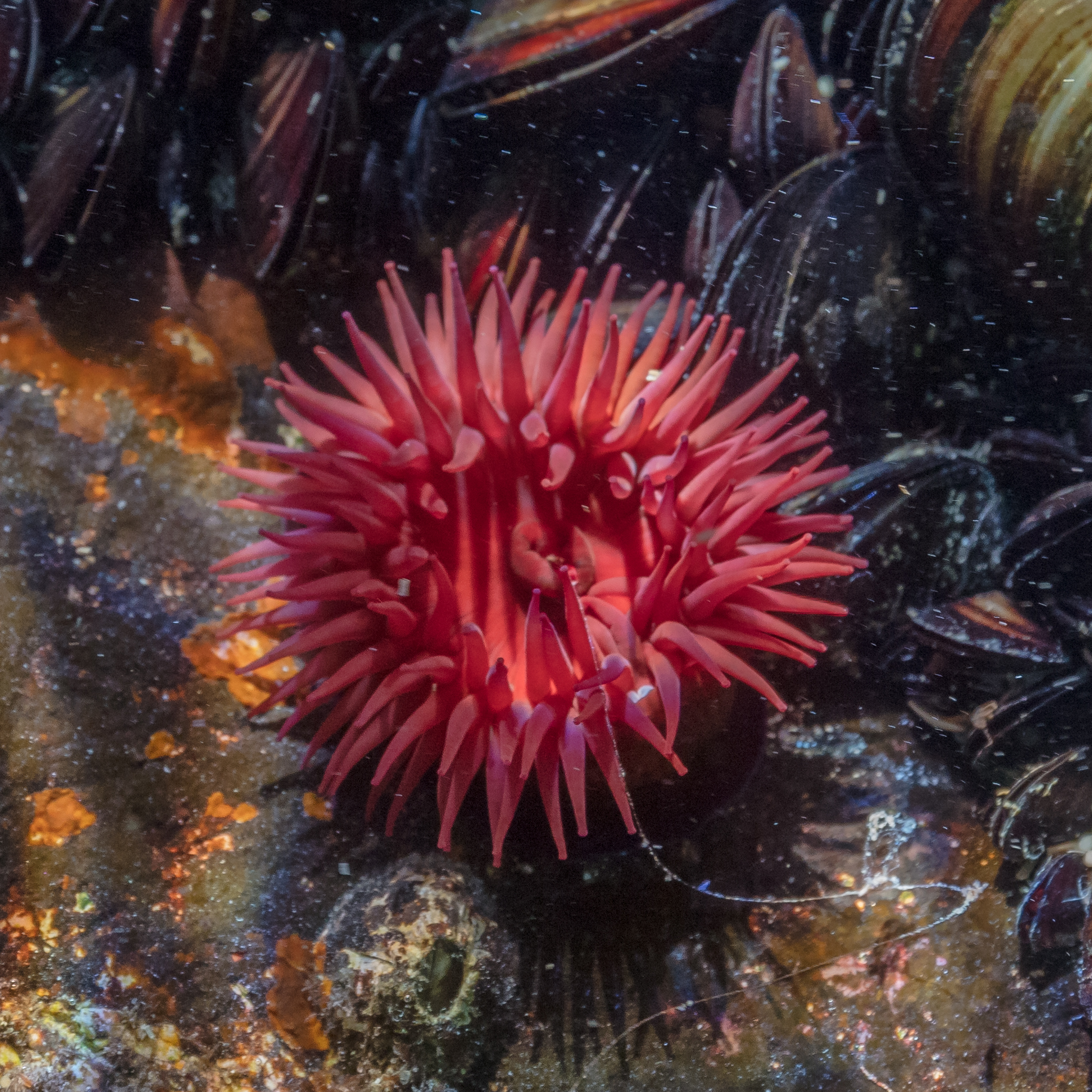

Conservation status
- Least Concern (IUCN 3.1) (Mediterranean)

Scientific classification
- Kingdom: Animalia
- Phylum: Cnidaria
- Subphylum: Anthozoa
- Class: Hexacorallia
- Order: Actiniaria
- Family: Actiniidae
- Genus: Actinia
- Species: A. equina

Binomial name
- Actinia equina (Linnaeus, 1758)

= Beadlet anemone =

Species of cnidarian, a sea anemone

The beadlet anemone (Actinia equina), also known as the sea tomato, is a common sea anemone found on rocky shores around all coasts of Northern and Western Europe as well as the Mediterranean Sea, along the Atlantic coast of Africa as far south as South Africa, Australia and the coasts of East Asia.

Actinia equina can be found both in exposed and sheltered situations. It is highly adapted to the intertidal zone as it can tolerate both high temperatures and desiccation. The anemone may also be found in regions of variable salinity such as estuaries.

Beadlet anemones can live in solitary or in aggregations. Solitary beadlet anemones are found to be larger-sized than those that form clustered aggregation. Furthermore, larger sea anemones were found submerged in low tide, where they have greater access to food resources and are less subjected to harsh environmental exposures. The size of beadlet anemones may be connected to their physiological adaptation in regards to limited food resources and withstanding environmental conditions.

Underwater, it displays up to 192 tentacles, arranged in six circles. Out of water, the tentacles retract and the anemone resembles a blob of red, brown, green or orange jelly, up to about 5 centimetres (2.0 in) across. It has bright blue beads (known as acrorhagi) located just beneath the tentacles, organised as an external ring containing stinging cells located at the top of the column that it uses to fight over territory. The acrorhagi contains the cnidocysts which themselves contain the nematocysts. There is some evidence that the various colour forms may in fact be different species.

Actinia equina is similar in form to the Waratah anemone (Actinia tenebrosa) of Australia and New Zealand. It is also similar in form to the strawberry anemone (Actinia fragacea) but is a uniform colour and is typically rather smaller.

Actinia equina is viviparous, with up to one hundred embryos developing inside the body cavity before being ejected into the open water as juveniles. A particularly famous example was that of "Granny" which was found on Scotland's east coast by John Dalyell in 1828 and produced several hundred offspring until it died in 1887.

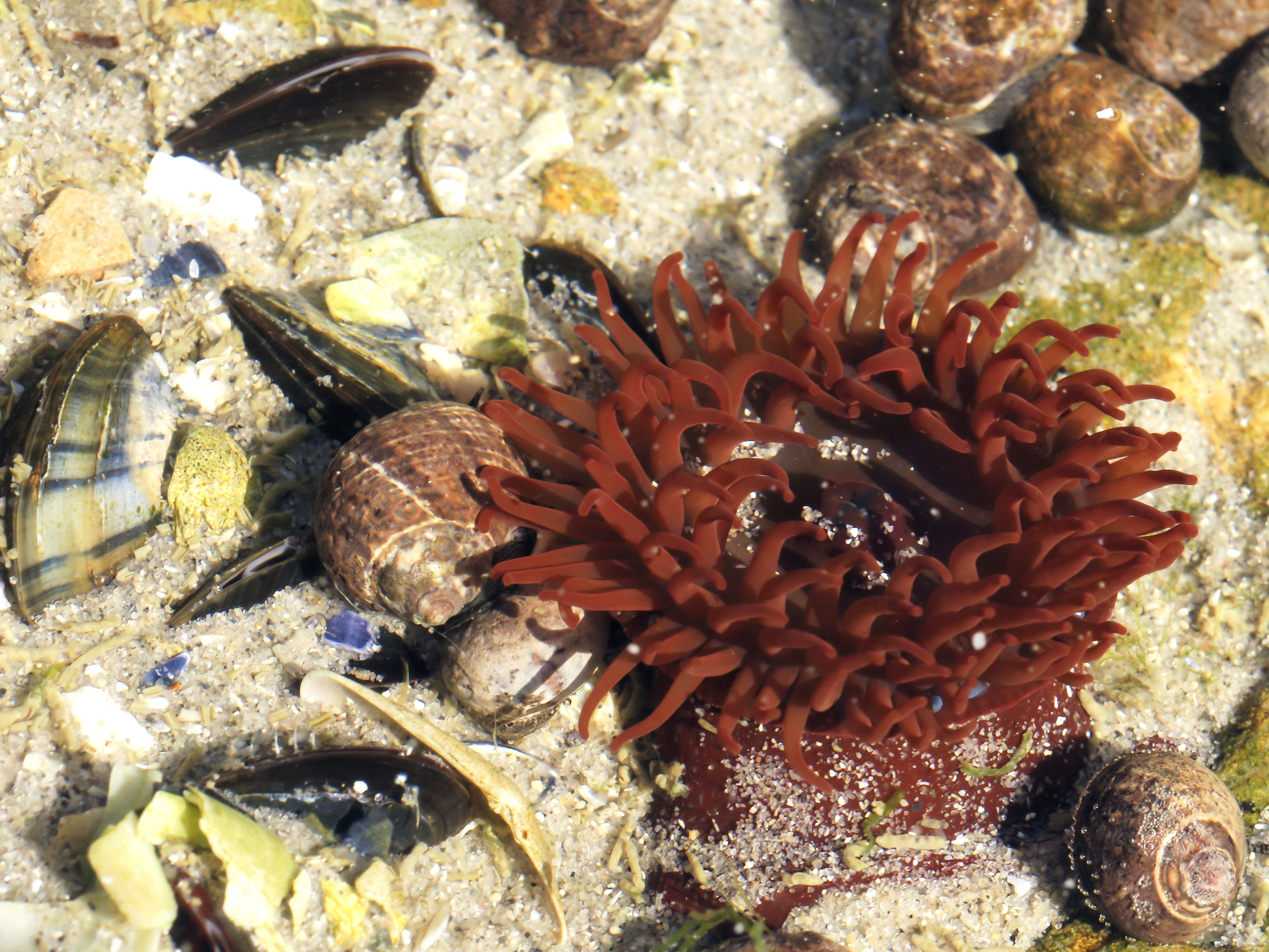

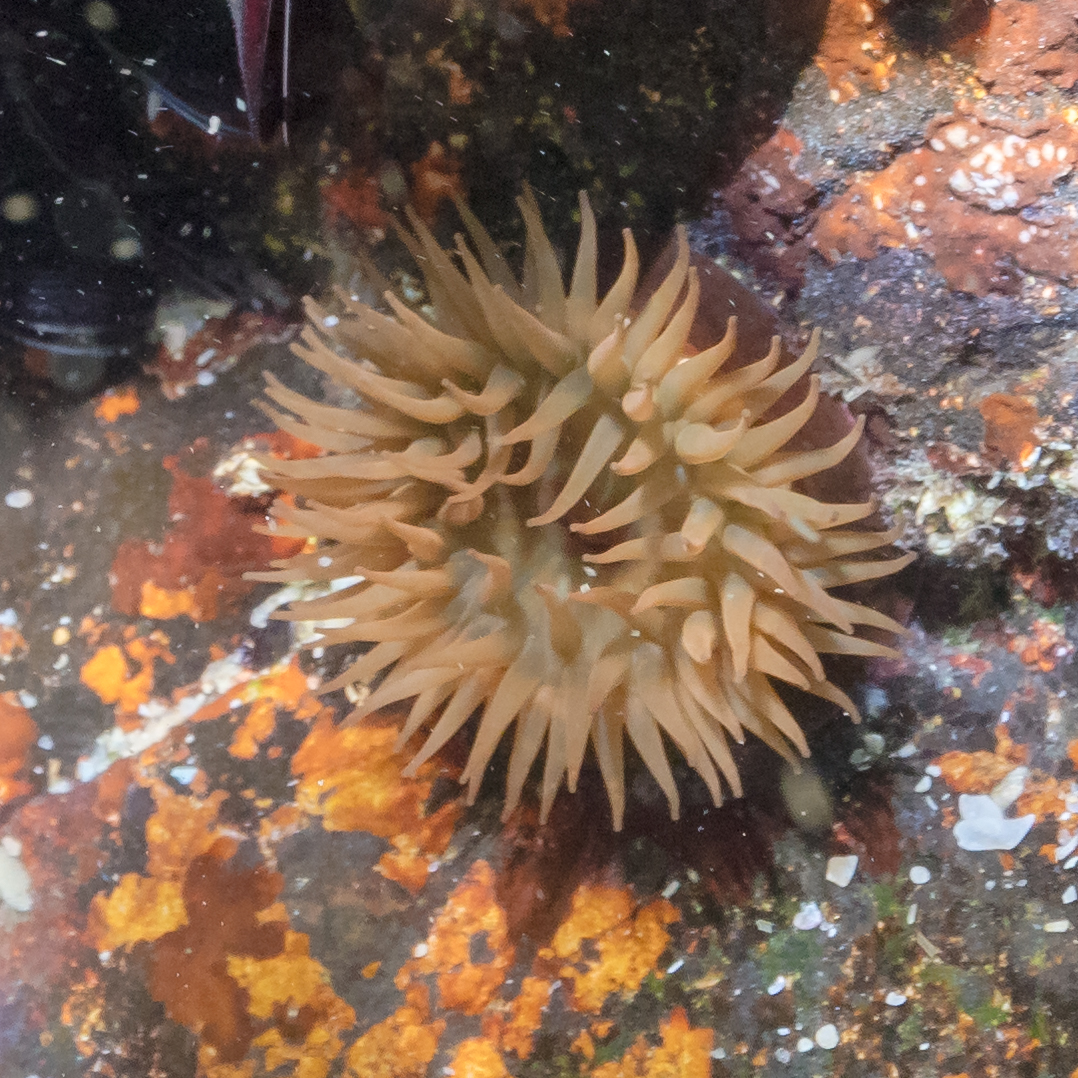

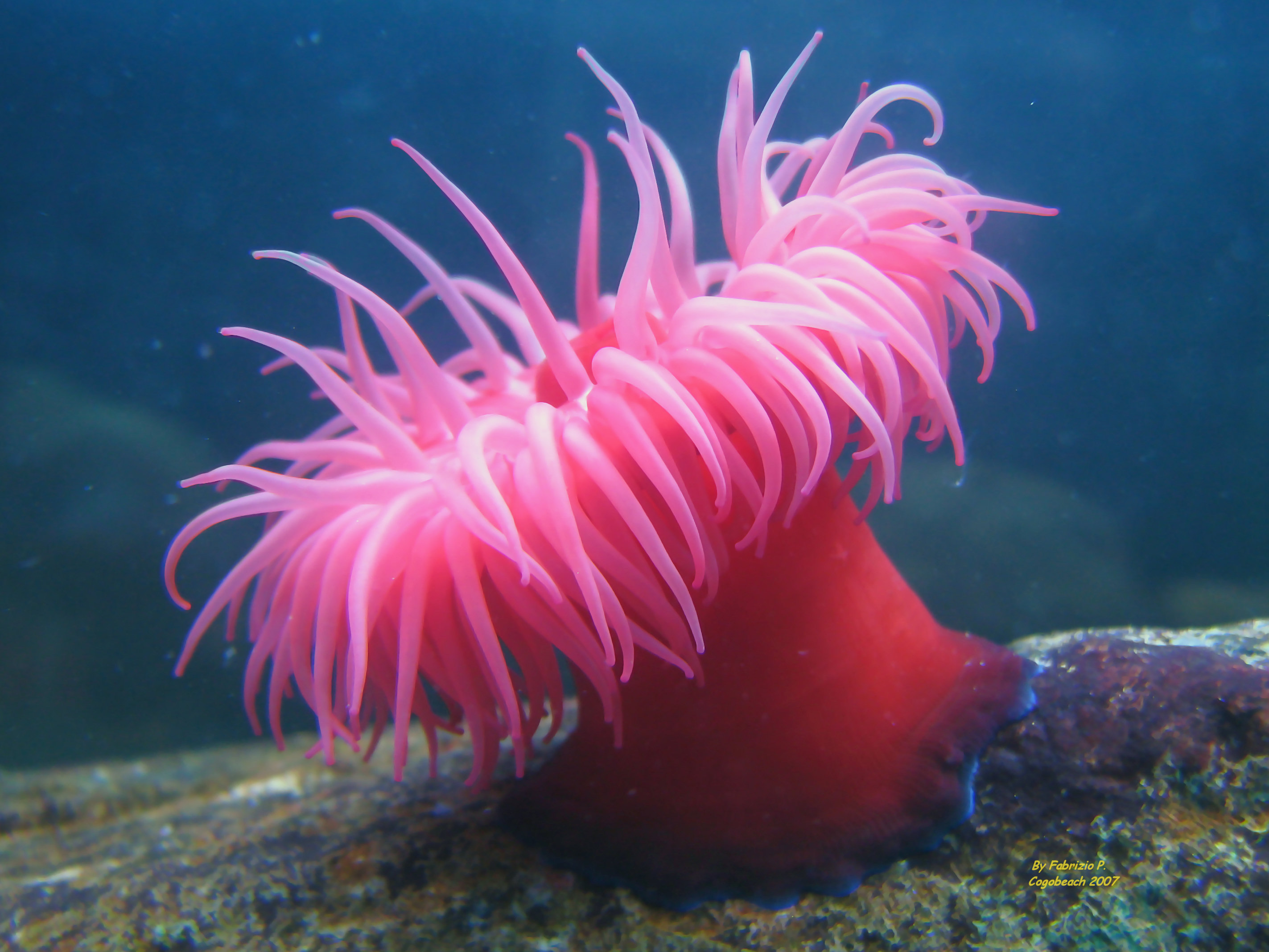

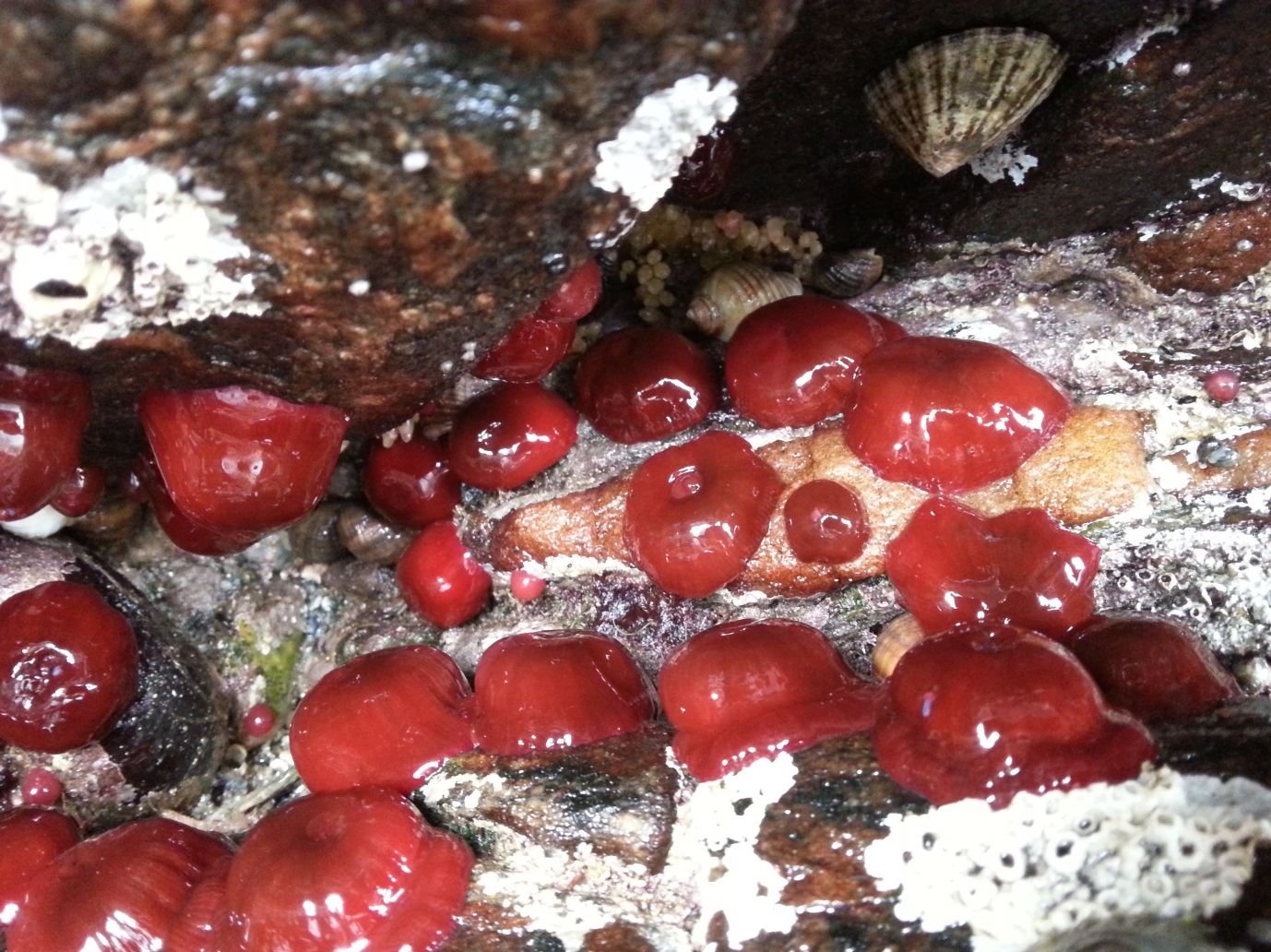
A colony of beadlet anemones (Rogaland, Norway)

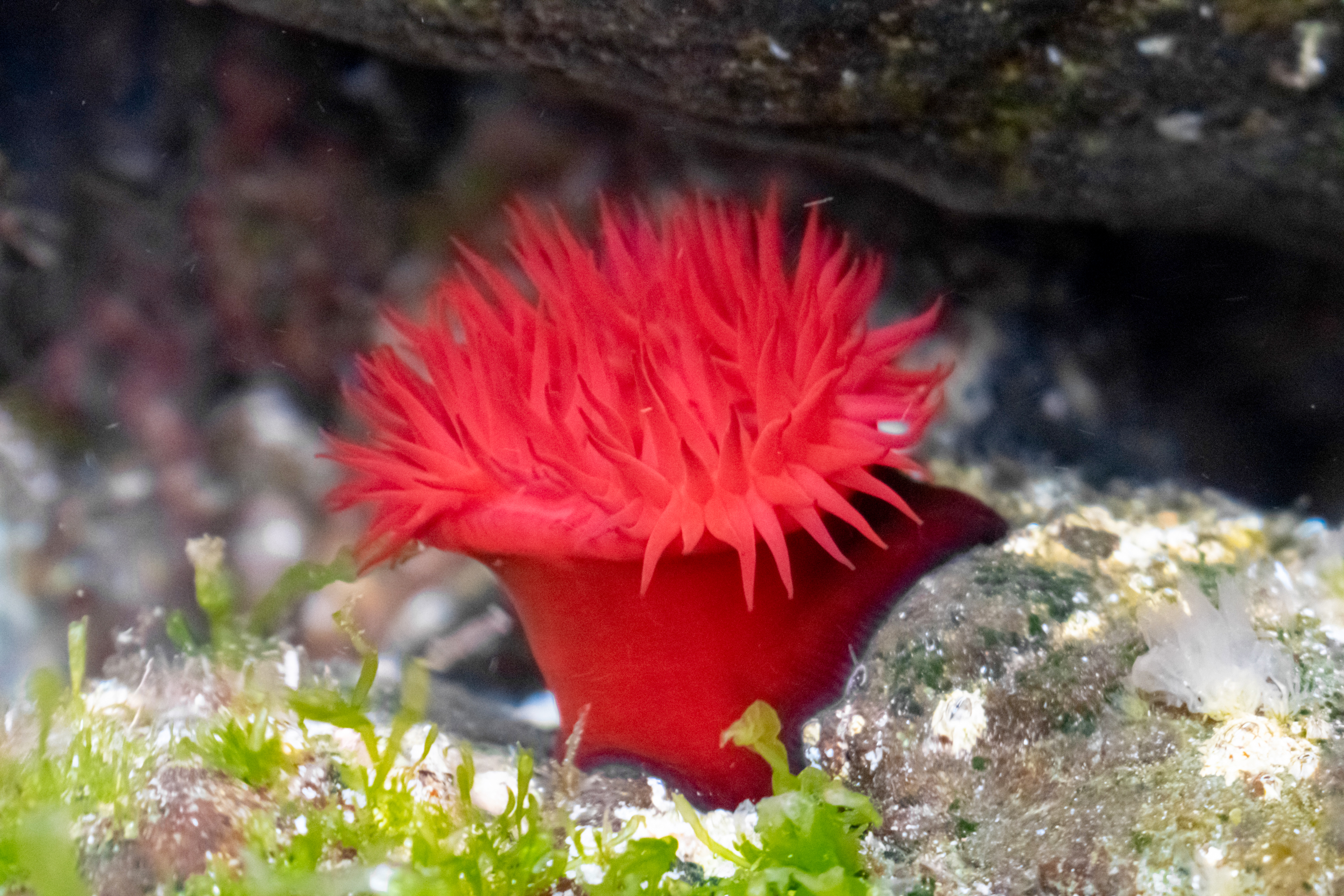

The only predator of beadlet anemone is the grey sea slug.
