= James A. Piper =

Australian-New Zealand physicist

- Born: 1 January 1947; New Zealand
- Died: 20 July 2023 (aged 76)
- Education: University of Otago
- Known for: Gas lasers Dye lasers Tunable lasers Diode-pumped solid-state lasers
- Awards: Pawsey Medal (1982); Walter Boas Medal (1984)
- Scientific career
- Fields: Physics; Lasers
- Workplaces: University of Oxford; Macquarie University
- Doctoral students: F. J. Duarte; Larry R. Marshall

James A. (Jim) Piper AM (1 January 1947 – 20 July 2023) was a New Zealand–Australian physicist, Deputy Vice-Chancellor (Research) and Professor of Physics at Macquarie University.

Piper studied physics at the University of Otago, New Zealand, and received a B.Sc. (Hons) in 1968. He completed a Ph.D. in atomic physics, also at Otago, in 1971. His post-doctoral research was on metal-vapour lasers, with Colin Webb at Oxford.

== Laser research in Australia ==
Following his arrival to Macquarie University in the late 1970s, from Oxford, Piper established one of the first laser research centres in Australia. Initially he directed his research toward gas lasers, continuous wave metal ion lasers, cyclic pulsed metal vapour lasers, and metal ion recombination lasers. He also added a laser development program on high-power tunable dye lasers for various applications including atomic vapor laser isotope separation. In this area of research he is co-author, with Frank Duarte, of a number of papers on tunable laser oscillator physics.

Piper's primary research interests were in solid-state lasers. In particular, diode-pumped solid-state lasers and related thermal engineering, mid-infrared solid state laser materials, solid state Raman lasers, and novel self-frequency-doubling laser materials.

== Awards ==
- 1982 Pawsey Medal, Australian Academy of Science
- 1984 Walter Boas Medal, Australian Institute of Physics
- 1994 Fellow of the Optical Society of America
- 1997 AOS Medal, Australian Optical Society
- 2004 Carnegie Centenary Professorship, Carnegie Trust for the Universities of Scotland
- 2006 Honorary Doctorate of Science, Heriot-Watt University, Scotland
- 2014 Member of the Order of Australia

== See also ==
- Multiple-prism dispersion theory
- Multiple-prism grating laser oscillators
