= Laser linewidth =

Spectral linewidth of a laser beam

Laser linewidth is the spectral linewidth of a laser beam.

Two of the most distinctive characteristics of laser emission are spatial coherence and spectral coherence. While spatial coherence is related to the beam divergence of the laser, spectral coherence is evaluated by measuring the linewidth of laser radiation.

== Theory ==
=== History: First derivation of the laser linewidth ===
The first human-made coherent light source was a maser. The acronym MASER stands for "Microwave Amplification by Stimulated Emission of Radiation". More precisely, it was the ammonia maser operating at 12.5 mm wavelength that was demonstrated by Gordon, Zeiger, and Townes in 1954. One year later the same authors derived theoretically the linewidth of their device by making the reasonable approximations that their ammonia maser

1. is a true continuous-wave (CW) maser,
2. is a true four-level maser, and
3. exhibits no intrinsic resonator losses but only outcoupling losses.

Notably, their derivation was entirely semi-classical, describing the ammonia molecules as quantum emitters and assuming classical electromagnetic fields (but no quantized fields or quantum fluctuations), resulting in the half-width-at-half-maximum (HWHM) maser linewidth

$$\Delta \nu_{\rm M}^* = \frac{4 \pi k_{\rm B} T (\Delta \nu_{\rm c}^*)^{2}}{P_{\rm out}} \Leftrightarrow \Delta \nu_{\rm M} = \frac{2 \pi k_{\rm B} T (\Delta \nu_{\rm c})^{2}}{P_{\rm out}},$$

denoted here by an asterisk and converted to the full-width-at-half-maximum (FWHM) linewidth $\Delta \nu_{\rm M} = 2 \Delta \nu_{\rm M}^*$. $k_{\rm B}$ is the Boltzmann constant, $T$ is the temperature, $P_{\rm out}$ is the output power, and $\Delta \nu_{\rm c}^*$ and $\Delta \nu_{\rm c} = 2 \Delta \nu_{\rm c}^*$ are the HWHM and FWHM linewidths of the underlying passive microwave resonator, respectively.

In 1958, two years before Maiman demonstrated the laser (initially called an "optical maser"), Schawlow and Townes transferred the maser linewidth to the optical regime by replacing the thermal energy $k_{\rm B} T$ by the photon energy $h \nu_{\rm L}$, where $h$ is the Planck constant and $\nu_{\rm L}$ is the frequency of laser light, thereby approximating that

iv. one photon is coupled into the lasing mode by spontaneous emission during the photon-decay time $\tau_{\rm c}$,

resulting in the original Schawlow–Townes approximation of the laser linewidth:

$$\Delta \nu_{\rm L,ST}^* = \frac{4 \pi h \nu_{\rm L} (\Delta \nu_{\rm c}^*)^{2}}{P_{\rm out}} \Leftrightarrow \Delta \nu_{\rm L,ST} = \frac{2 \pi h \nu_{\rm L} (\Delta \nu_{\rm c})^{2}}{P_{\rm out}}.$$

Again, the transfer from the microwave to the optical regime was entirely semi-classical. Consequently, the original Schawlow–Townes equation is entirely based on semi-classical physics and is a four-fold approximation of a more general laser linewidth, which will be derived in the following.

=== Passive resonator mode: Photon-decay time ===
We assume a two-mirror Fabry–Pérot resonator of geometrical length $\ell$, homogeneously filled with an active laser medium of refractive index $n$. We define the reference situation, namely the passive resonator mode, for a resonator whose active medium is transparent, i.e., it does not introduce gain or absorption.

The round-trip time $t_{\rm RT}$ of light travelling in the resonator with speed $c = c_0/n$, where $c_0$ is the speed of light in vacuum, and the free spectral range $\Delta \nu_{\rm FSR}$ are given by

$$t_{\rm RT} = \frac{1}{\Delta \nu_{\rm FSR}} = \frac{2 \ell}{c}.$$

Light in the longitudinal resonator mode of interest oscillates at the qth resonance frequency

$$\nu_L = \frac{q}{t_{\rm RT}} = q \Delta \nu_{\rm FSR}.$$

The exponential outcoupling decay time $\tau_{\rm out}$ and the corresponding decay-rate constant $1 / \tau_{\rm out}$ are related to the intensity reflectances $R_i$ of the two resonator mirrors $i = 1, 2$ by

$$R_1 R_2 = e^{- t_{\rm RT} / \tau_{\rm out}} \Rightarrow \frac{1}{\tau_{\rm out}} = \frac{-\ln{(R_1 R_2)}}{t_{\rm RT}}.$$

The exponential intrinsic loss time $\tau_{\rm loss}$ and the corresponding decay-rate constant $1 / \tau_{\rm loss}$ are related to the intrinsic round-trip loss $L_{\rm RT}$ by

$$1 - L_{\rm RT} = e^{- t_{\rm RT} / \tau_{\rm loss}} \Rightarrow \frac{1}{\tau_{\rm loss}} = \frac{-\ln{(1 - L_{\rm RT})}}{t_{\rm RT}}.$$

The exponential photon-decay time $\tau_\text{c}$ and the corresponding decay-rate constant $1 / \tau_{\rm c}$ of the passive resonator are then given by

$$\frac{1}{\tau_{\rm c}} = \frac{1}{\tau_{\rm out}} + \frac{1}{\tau_{\rm loss}} = \frac{-\ln{[R_1 R_2 (1 - L_{\rm RT})]}}{t_{\rm RT}}.$$

All three exponential decay times average over the round-trip time $t_{\rm RT}.$ In the following, we assume that $\ell$, $n$, $R_1$, $R_2$, and $L_{\rm RT}$, hence also $\tau_{\rm out}$, $\tau_{\rm loss}$, and $\tau_{\rm c}$ do not vary significantly over the frequency range of interest.

=== Passive resonator mode: Lorentzian linewidth, Q-factor, coherence time and length ===
Besides the photon-decay time $\tau_{\rm c}$, the spectral-coherence properties of the passive resonator mode can be equivalently expressed by the following parameters. The FWHM Lorentzian linewidth $\Delta \nu_{\rm c}$ of the passive resonator mode that appears in the Schawlow–Townes equation is derived from the exponential photon-decay time $\tau_{\rm c}$ by Fourier transformation,

$$\Delta \nu_{\rm c} = \frac{1}{2 \pi \tau_{\rm c}}.$$

The Q-factor $Q_{\rm c}$ is defined as the energy $W_{\rm stored}$ stored in the resonator mode over the energy $W_{\rm lost}$ lost per oscillation cycle,

$$Q_{\rm c} = 2 \pi \frac{W_{\rm stored}(t)}{W_{\rm lost}(t)} = 2 \pi \frac{\varphi (t)}{-\frac{1}{\nu_L} \frac{d}{dt} \varphi (t)} = 2 \pi \nu_L \tau_{\rm c} = \frac{\nu_L}{\Delta \nu_{\rm c}},$$

where $\varphi = W_{\rm stored} / h \nu_L$ is the number of photons in the mode. The coherence time $\tau_{\rm c}^{\rm coh}$ and coherence length $\ell_{\rm c}^{\rm coh}$ of light emitted from the mode are given by

$$\tau_{\rm c}^{\rm coh} = \frac{1}{c} \ell_{\rm c}^{\rm coh} = 2 \tau_{\rm c}.$$

=== Active resonator mode: Gain, photon-decay time, Lorentzian linewidth, Q-factor, coherence time and length ===
With the population densities $N_{2}$ and $N_{1}$ of upper and lower laser level, respectively, and the effective cross sections $\sigma_{\rm e}$ and $\sigma_{\rm a}$ of stimulated emission and absorption at the resonance frequency $\nu_L$, respectively, the gain per unit length in the active laser medium at the resonance frequency $\nu_L$ is given by

$$g = \sigma_{\rm e} N_{2} - \sigma_{\rm a} N_{1}.$$

A value of $g > 0$ induces amplification, whereas $g < 0$ induces absorption of light at the resonance frequency $\nu_L$, resulting in an elongated or shortened photon-decay time $\tau_{\rm L}$ of photons out of the active resonator mode, respectively,

$$\frac{1}{\tau_{\rm L}} = \frac{1}{\tau_{\rm c}} - cg.$$

The other four spectral-coherence properties of the active resonator mode are obtained in the same way as for the passive resonator mode. The Lorentzian linewidth is derived by Fourier transformation,

$$\Delta \nu_{\rm L} = \frac{1}{2 \pi \tau_{\rm L}}.$$

A value of $g > 0$ leads to gain narrowing, whereas $g < 0$ leads to absorption broadening of the spectral linewidth. The Q-factor is

$$Q_{\rm L} = 2 \pi \frac{W_{\rm stored}(t)}{W_{\rm lost}(t)} = 2 \pi \frac{\varphi (t)}{-\frac{1}{\nu_L} \frac{d}{dt} \varphi (t)} = 2 \pi \nu_L \tau_{\rm L} = \frac{\nu_L}{\Delta \nu_{\rm L}}.$$

The coherence time and length are

$$\tau_{\rm L}^{\rm coh} = \frac{1}{c} \ell_{\rm L}^{\rm coh} = 2 \tau_{\rm L}.$$

=== Spectral-coherence factor ===
The factor by which the photon-decay time is elongated by gain or shortened by absorption is introduced here as the spectral-coherence factor $\Lambda$:

$$\Lambda := \frac{1}{1 - cg \tau_{\rm c}}.$$

All five spectral-coherence parameters then scale by the same spectral-coherence factor $\Lambda$:

$$\begin{align}
\tau_{\rm L} &= \Lambda \tau_{\rm c}, &
(\Delta \nu_{\rm L})^{-1} &= \Lambda (\Delta \nu_{\rm c})^{-1}, &
Q_{\rm L} &= \Lambda Q_{\rm c}, &
\tau_{\rm L}^{\rm coh} &= \Lambda \tau_{\rm c}^{\rm coh}, &
\ell_{\rm L}^{\rm coh} &= \Lambda \ell_{\rm c}^{\rm coh}.
\end{align}$$

=== Lasing resonator mode: Fundamental laser linewidth ===
With the number $\varphi$ of photons propagating inside the lasing resonator mode, the stimulated-emission and photon-decay rates are, respectively,

$$R_{\rm st} = cg \varphi,$$
$$R_{\rm decay} = \frac{1}{\tau_{\rm c}} \varphi.$$

The spectral-coherence factor then becomes

$$\Lambda = \frac{R_{\rm decay}}{R_{\rm decay} - R_{\rm st}}.$$

The photon-decay time of the lasing resonator mode is

$$\tau_{\rm L} = \Lambda \tau_{\rm c} = \frac{R_{\rm decay}}{R_{\rm decay} - R_{\rm st}} \tau_{\rm c}.$$

The fundamental laser linewidth is

$$\Delta \nu_{\rm L} = \frac{1}{\Lambda} \Delta \nu_{\rm c} = \frac{R_{\rm decay} - R_{\rm st}}{R_{\rm decay}} \Delta \nu_{\rm c}.$$

This fundamental linewidth is valid for lasers with an arbitrary energy-level system, operating below, at, or above threshold, with the gain being smaller, equal, or larger compared to the losses, and in a cw or a transient lasing regime.

It becomes clear from its derivation that the fundamental laser linewidth is due to the semi-classical effect that the gain elongates the photon-decay time.

=== Continuous-wave laser: The gain is smaller than the losses ===
The spontaneous-emission rate into the lasing resonator mode is given by

$$R_{\rm sp} = c \sigma_{\rm e} N_{2}.$$

Notably, $R_{\rm sp}$ is always a positive rate, because one atomic excitation is converted into one photon in the lasing mode. It is the source term of laser radiation and must not be misinterpreted as "noise". The photon-rate equation for a single lasing mode reads

$$\frac{d}{dt} \varphi = R_{\rm sp} + R_{\rm st} - R_{\rm decay} = c \sigma_{\rm e} N_{2} + cg \varphi - \frac{1}{\tau_{\rm c}} \varphi.$$

A CW laser is defined by a temporally constant number of photons in the lasing mode, hence $d \varphi / dt = 0$. In a CW laser the stimulated- and spontaneous-emission rates together compensate the photon-decay rate. Consequently,

$$R_{\rm st} - R_{\rm decay} = -R_{\rm sp} < 0.$$

The stimulated-emission rate is smaller than the photon-decay rate or, colloquially, "the gain is smaller than the losses". This fact has been known for decades and exploited to quantify the threshold behavior of semiconductor lasers. Even far above laser threshold the gain is still a tiny bit smaller than the losses. It is exactly this small difference that induces the finite linewidth of a CW laser.

It becomes clear from this derivation that fundamentally the laser is an amplifier of spontaneous emission, and the cw laser linewidth is due to the semi-classical effect that the gain is smaller than the losses. Also in the quantum-optical approaches to the laser linewidth, based on the density-operator master equation, it can be verified that the gain is smaller than the losses.

=== Schawlow–Townes approximation ===
As mentioned above, it is clear from its historical derivation that the original Schawlow–Townes equation is a four-fold approximation of the fundamental laser linewidth. Starting from the fundamental laser linewidth $\Delta \nu_{\rm L}$ derived above, by applying the four approximations i.–iv. one then obtains the original Schawlow–Townes equation.

1. It is a true CW laser, hence
  $$R_{\rm decay} - R_{\rm st} = R_{\rm sp} \Rightarrow$$
  $$\Delta \nu_{\rm L} = \frac{1}{\Lambda} \Delta \nu_{\rm c} = \frac{R_{\rm decay} - R_{\rm st}}{R_{\rm decay}} \Delta \nu_{\rm c} = \frac{R_{\rm sp}}{R_{\rm decay}} \Delta \nu_{\rm c}.$$
2. It is a true four-level laser, hence
  $$N_{1} = 0 \Rightarrow cg = c (\sigma_{\rm e} N_{2} - \sigma_{\rm a} N_{1}) = c \sigma_{\rm e} N_{2} = R_{\rm sp} \Rightarrow$$
  $$\Delta \nu_{\rm L} = \frac{R_{\rm sp}}{R_{\rm decay}} \Delta \nu_{\rm c} = \frac{cg}{\frac{1}{\tau_{\rm c}} \varphi} \Delta \nu_{\rm c}.$$
3. It has no intrinsic resonator losses, hence
  $$\frac{1}{\tau_{\rm loss}} = 0 \Rightarrow \frac{1}{\tau_{\rm c}} = \frac{1}{\tau_{\rm out}} \Rightarrow P_{\rm out} = h \nu_{\rm L} \frac{1}{\tau_{\rm out}} \varphi = h \nu_{\rm L} \frac{1}{\tau_{\rm c}} \varphi \Rightarrow$$
  $$\Delta \nu_{\rm L} = \frac{cg}{\frac{1}{\tau_{\rm c}} \varphi} \Delta \nu_{\rm c} = \frac{cg h \nu_{\rm L}}{P_{\rm out}} \Delta \nu_{\rm c}.$$
4. One photon is coupled into the lasing mode by spontaneous emission during the photon-decay time $\tau_{\rm c}$, which would happen exactly at the unreachable point of an ideal four-level CW laser with infinite spectral-coherence factor $\Lambda$, photon number $\varphi$, and output power $P_{\rm out}$, where the gain would equal the losses, hence
  $$R_{\rm st} = R_{\rm decay} \Rightarrow R_{\rm sp} = cg = \frac{1}{\tau_{\rm c}} = 2 \pi \Delta \nu_{\rm c} \Rightarrow$$
  $$\Delta \nu_{\rm L} = \frac{cg h \nu_{\rm L}}{P_{\rm out}} \Delta \nu_{\rm c} = \frac{2 \pi h \nu_{\rm L} (\Delta \nu_{\rm c})^{2}}{P_{\rm out}} = \Delta \nu_{\rm L,ST}.$$

I.e., by applying the same four approximations i.–iv. to the fundamental laser linewidth $\Delta \nu_{\rm L}$ that were applied in the first derivation, the original Schawlow–Townes equation is obtained.

Thus, the fundamental laser linewidth is

$$\Delta \nu_{\rm L} = \frac{1}{\Lambda} \Delta \nu_{\rm c} = \frac{R_{\rm decay} - R_{\rm st}}{R_{\rm decay}} \Delta \nu_{\rm c} = (1 - cg \tau_{\rm c}) \Delta \nu_{\rm c} = \Delta \nu_{\rm c} - \frac{cg}{2 \pi},$$

whereas the original Schawlow–Townes equation is a four-fold approximation of this fundamental laser linewidth and is merely of historical interest.

=== Additional linewidth broadening and narrowing effects ===
Following its publication in 1958, the original Schawlow–Townes equation was extended in various ways. These extended equations often trade under the same name, the "Schawlow–Townes linewidth", thereby creating a veritable confusion in the available literature on the laser linewidth, as it is often unclear which particular extension of the original Schawlow–Townes equation the respective authors refer to.

Several semi-classical extensions intended to remove one or several of the approximations i.–iv. mentioned above, thereby making steps towards the fundamental laser linewidth derived above.

The following extensions may add to the fundamental laser linewidth:

1. Hempstead and Lax, as well as Haken, predicted quantum-mechanically an additional linewidth narrowing by a factor of two near laser threshold. However, such an effect was observed experimentally only in a handful of cases.
2. Petermann derived semi-classically a previously experimentally observed linewidth-broadening effect in gain-guided compared to index-guided semiconductor waveguide lasers. Siegman later showed that this effect is due to the non-orthogonality of transverse modes. Woerdman and co-workers extended this idea to longitudinal modes and polarization modes. As a result, the so-called "Petermann K-factor" is sometimes added to the laser linewidth.
3. Henry predicted quantum-mechanically an additional linewidth broadening due to refractive-index changes related to electron-hole-pair excitation, which induce phase changes. As a result, the so-called "Henry's $\alpha$-factor" is sometimes added to the laser linewidth.

== Measurement of laser linewidth ==
One of the first methods used to measure the coherence of a laser was interferometry. A typical method to measure the laser linewidth is self-heterodyne interferometry. An alternative approach is the use of spectrometry.

== Continuous lasers ==
The laser linewidth in a typical single-transverse-mode He–Ne laser (at a wavelength of 632.8 nm), in the absence of intracavity line narrowing optics, can be on the order of 1 GHz. Rare-earth-doped dielectric-based or semiconductor-based distributed-feedback lasers have typical linewidths on the order of 1 kHz. The laser linewidth from stabilized low-power continuous-wave lasers can be very narrow and reach down to less than 1 kHz. Observed linewidths are larger than the fundamental laser linewidth due to technical noise (temporal fluctuations of the optical pump power or pump current, mechanical vibrations, refractive-index and length changes due to temperature fluctuations, etc.).

== Pulsed lasers ==
Laser linewidth from high-power, high-gain pulsed-lasers, in the absence of intracavity line narrowing optics, can be quite broad and in the case of powerful broadband dye lasers it can range from a few nm wide to as broad as 10 nm.

Laser linewidth from high-power high-gain pulsed laser oscillators, comprising line narrowing optics, is a function of the geometrical and dispersive features of the laser cavity. To a first approximation the laser linewidth, in an optimized cavity, is directly proportional to the beam divergence of the emission multiplied by the inverse of the overall intracavity dispersion. That is,

$$\Delta\lambda \approx \Delta \theta \left({\partial\Theta\over\partial\lambda}\right)^{-1}$$

This is known as the cavity linewidth equation where $\Delta \theta$ is the beam divergence and the term in parentheses (elevated to −1) is the overall intracavity dispersion. This equation was originally derived from classical optics. However, in 1992 Duarte derived this equation from quantum interferometric principles, thus linking a quantum expression with the overall intracavity angular dispersion.

An optimized multiple-prism grating laser oscillator can deliver pulse emission in the kW regime at single-longitudinal-mode linewidths of $\Delta \nu$ ≈ 350 MHz (equivalent to $\Delta \lambda$ ≈ 0.0004 nm at a laser wavelength of 590 nm). Since the pulse duration from these oscillators is about 3 ns, the laser linewidth performance is near the limit allowed by the Heisenberg uncertainty principle.

== See also ==
- Laser
- Fabry–Perot interferometer
- Beam divergence
- Multiple-prism dispersion theory
- Multiple-prism grating laser oscillator
- N-slit interferometric equation
- Oscillator linewidth
- Solid state dye lasers
