= Complex beam parameter =

Specifies the properties of a Gaussian beam

In optics, the complex beam parameter is a complex number that specifies the properties of a Gaussian beam at a particular point z along the axis of the beam. It is usually denoted by q. It can be calculated from the beam's vacuum wavelength λ_{0}, the radius of curvature R of the phase front, the index of refraction n (n=1 for air), and the beam radius w (defined at 1/e^{2} intensity), according to:

$$\frac{1}{q(z)} = \frac{1}{R(z)} - \frac{i\lambda_0}{\pi n w(z)^2}$$.

Alternatively, q can be calculated according to

$q(z) = z + \frac{i \pi n w_0^2}{\lambda_0}= z + z_\mathrm{R} i\ ,$

where z is the location, relative to the location of the beam waist, at which q is calculated, z_{R} is the Rayleigh range, and i is the imaginary unit.

== Beam propagation ==
The complex beam parameter is usually used in ray transfer matrix analysis, which allows the calculation of the beam properties at any given point as it propagates through an optical system, if the ray matrix and the initial complex beam parameter is known. This same method can also be used to find the fundamental mode size of a stable optical resonator.

Given the initial beam parameter, q_{i}, one can use the ray transfer matrix of an optical system,
$$\begin{pmatrix} A & B \\ C & D \end{pmatrix}$$
, to find the resulting beam parameter, q_{f}, after the beam has traversed the system:

$$q_f = \frac{Aq_i+B}{Cq_i+D}$$.

It is often convenient to express this equation in terms of the reciprocals of q:

$${  1 \over q_f } = \frac{C+D/q_i}{A+B/q_i}$$.

=== Free-space propagation ===
The effect of propagation in free space is just that of adding the travelled axial distance Δz to the complex beam parameter:

$$q_f = q_i + \Delta z$$.

=== Interfaces ===
For simple astigmatic fundamental Gaussian beams, the q- parameters for the tangential and sagittal planes are independent. This is no longer true if those planes do not coincide with the principal direction of the surface on which the beam impinges; that case is called general astigmatism. Formulas for an incidence angle θ_{i} were derived in Massey and Siegman's 1969 paper.

For reflection, the ABCD matrices read:

$$\begin{align}
M_t&=\begin{pmatrix} 1 & 0 \\ \frac{2}{R_I \cos\theta_i} & 1 \end{pmatrix}, &
M_t&=\begin{pmatrix} 1 & 0 \\ \frac{2 \cos\theta_i}{R_S} & 1 \end{pmatrix}.
\end{align}$$

The ones for refraction are:

$$\begin{align}
M_t&=\begin{pmatrix} \frac{\sqrt{n_r^2-\sin^2 \theta_i}}{n_r \cos \theta_i} & 0 \\
\frac{\cos \theta_i-\sqrt{n_r^2-\sin^2 \theta_i}}{R_I \cos \theta_i \sqrt{n_r^2-\sin^2 \theta_i}} & \frac{\cos \theta_i}{\sqrt{n_r^2-\sin^2 \theta_i}} \end{pmatrix}, &
M_t&=\begin{pmatrix} 1 & 0
\\ \frac{\cos \theta_i-\sqrt{n_r^2-\sin^2 \theta_i}}{R_S n_r} & {1 \over n_r} \end{pmatrix}.
\end{align}$$

=== Fundamental mode of an optical resonator ===
To find the complex beam parameter of a stable optical resonator, one needs to find the ray matrix of the cavity. This is done by tracing the path of beam in the cavity. Assuming a starting point, find the matrix that goes through the cavity and return until the beam is in the same position and direction as the starting point. With this matrix and by making q_{i} = q_{f}, a quadratic is formed as:

$$C{q_f}^2 + (D-A)q_f - B = 0$$.

Solving this equation gives the beam parameter for the chosen starting position in the cavity, and by propagating, the beam parameter for any other location in the cavity can be found.
