= Gravity's Rainbow (disambiguation) =

Gravity's Rainbow is a 1973 novel by Thomas Pynchon.

Gravity's Rainbow may also refer to:

- Gravity's Rainbow (album), a 1993 album by Pat Benatar
- "Gravity's Rainbow" (song), a 2006 song by Klaxons
- Rainbow gravity theory or "gravity's rainbow", a physics theory
