= Compound prism =

Geometric object

A compound prism is a set of multiple triangular prism elements placed in contact, and often cemented together to form a solid assembly. The use of multiple elements gives several advantages to an optical designer:

- One can achieve spectral dispersion without causing the deviation of the beam at the design wavelength. Thus, light at the design wavelength which enters at an angle $\theta_0$ with respect to the optical axis, exits the prism at the same angle with respect to the same axis. This kind of effect is often called "direct vision dispersion" or "nondeviating dispersion".
- One can achieve deviation of the incident beam while also greatly reducing the dispersion introduced into the beam: an achromatic deflecting prism. This effect is used in beam steering.
- One can tune the prism dispersion to achieve greater dispersion linearity or to achieve higher-order dispersion effects.

== Doublet ==
A doublet prism, showing the apex angles ($\alpha_1$ and $\alpha_2$) of the two elements, and the angles of incidence $\theta_i$ and refraction $\theta'_i$ at each interface. The deviation angle of the ray transmitted by the prism is shown as $\delta$.

The simplest compound prism is a doublet, consisting of two elements in contact, as shown in the figure at right. A ray of light passing through the prism is refracted at the first air-glass interface, again at the interface between the two glasses, and a final time at the exiting glass-air interface. The deviation angle $\delta$ of the ray is given by the difference in ray angle between the incident ray and the exiting ray: $\delta = \theta_0 - \theta_4$. While one can produce direct vision dispersion from doublet prisms, there is typically significant displacement of the beam (shown as a separation between the two dashed horizontal lines in the y direction). Mathematically, one can calculate $\delta$ by concatenating the Snell's law equations at each interface,

$$\begin{align}
\theta_1 &= \theta_0 - \beta_1                               &\theta_3 &= \theta'_2 - \alpha_2 \\
\theta'_1 &= \arcsin (\tfrac{1}{n_1} \, \sin \theta_1) \quad &\theta'_3 &= \arcsin (n_2 \, \sin \theta_3) \\
\theta_2 &= \theta'_1 - \alpha_1                             &\theta_4 &= \theta'_3 + \tfrac{1}{2} \alpha_2 \\
\theta'_2 &= \arcsin (\tfrac{n_1}{n_2} \, \sin \theta_2)
\end{align}$$

so that the deviation angle is a nonlinear function of the glass refractive indices $n_1 (\lambda)$ and $n_2 (\lambda)$, the prism elements' apex angles $\alpha_1$ and $\alpha_2$, and the angle of incidence $\theta_0$ of the ray. Note that $\alpha_i$ indicates that the prism is inverted (the apex points downward).

If the angle of incidence $\theta_0$ and prism apex angle $\alpha$ are both small, then $\sin \theta \approx \theta$ and $\text{arcsin} (x) \approx x$, so that the nonlinear equation in the deviation angle $\delta$ can be approximated by the linear form

$$\delta (\lambda) = \big[ n_1 (\lambda) - 1 \big] \alpha_1 + \big[ n_2 (\lambda) - 1 \big] \alpha_2 \ .$$

(See also prism deviation and dispersion.) If we further assume that the wavelength dependence to the refractive index is approximately linear, then the dispersion can be written as

$$\Delta = \frac{\delta_1 (\bar{\lambda})}{V_1} + \frac{\delta_2 (\bar{\lambda})}{V_2} \ ,$$

where $\delta_i$ and $V_i$ are the dispersion and Abbe number of element $i$ within the compound prism, $V_i = (\bar{n} - 1) / (n_F - n_C)$. The central wavelength of the spectrum is denoted $\bar{\lambda}$.

Doublet prisms are often used for direct-vision dispersion. In order to design such a prism, we let $\bar{\delta} = 0$, and simultaneously solving equations $\delta$ and $\Delta$ gives

$$\delta_1 (\bar{\lambda}) = - \delta_2 (\bar{\lambda}) = -\Delta \Big( \frac{1}{V_2} - \frac{1}{V_1} \Big)^{-1} \ ,$$

from which one can obtain the element apex angles $\alpha_1$ and $\alpha_2$ from the mean refractive indices of the glasses chosen:

$$\begin{align}
\alpha_1 &= \frac{\Delta}{\bar{n}_1 - 1} \Big( \frac{1}{V_1} - \frac{1}{V_2} \Big)^{-1} \ , \\
\alpha_2 &= \frac{\Delta}{\bar{n}_2 - 1} \Big( \frac{1}{V_2} - \frac{1}{V_1} \Big)^{-1} \ .
\end{align}$$

Note that this formula is only accurate under the small angle approximation.

== Double-Amici ==
While the doublet prism is the simplest compound prism type, the double-Amici prism is much more common. This prism is a three-element system (a triplet), in which the first and third elements share both the same glass and the same apex angles. The design layout is thus symmetric about the plane passing through the center of its second element. Due to its symmetry, the linear design equations (under the small angle approximation) for the double-Amici prism differ from those of the doublet prism only by a factor of 2 in front of the first term in each equation:

A double-Amici prism, showing the apex angles ($\alpha_1$ and $\alpha_2$) of the three elements, and the angles of incidence $\theta_i$ and refraction $\theta'_i$ at each interface.

$$\begin{align}
\delta (\bar{\lambda}) &= 2 \delta_1 (\bar{\lambda}) + \delta_2 (\bar{\lambda}) = 2 \big( \bar{n}_1 - 1) \alpha_1 + \big( \bar{n}_2 - 1) \alpha_2 \ , \\
\Delta &= 2 \frac{\delta_1 (\bar{\lambda})}{V_1} + \frac{\delta_2 (\bar{\lambda})}{V_2} \ .
\end{align}$$

Thus, we can derive the expressions for the prism angles using these linear equations, giving

$$\begin{align}
\alpha_1 &= \frac{\Delta}{2 (\bar{n}_1 - 1)} \Big( \frac{1}{V_1} - \frac{1}{V_2} \Big)^{-1} \ , \\
\alpha_2 &= \frac{\Delta}{\bar{n}_2 - 1} \Big( \frac{1}{V_2} - \frac{1}{V_1} \Big)^{-1} \ .
\end{align}$$

The exact nonlinear equation for the deviation angle $\delta$ is obtained by concatenating the refraction equations obtained at each interface:

$$\begin{align}
\theta_1 &= \theta_0 + \alpha_1 - \tfrac{1}{2} \alpha_2      &\theta'_3 &= \arcsin (\tfrac{n_2}{n_1} \, \sin \theta_3) \\
\theta'_1 &= \arcsin (\tfrac{1}{n_1} \, \sin \theta_1) \quad &\theta_4 &= \theta'_3 - \alpha_1 \\
\theta_2 &= \theta'_1 - \alpha_1                             &\theta'_4 &= \arcsin (n_1 \, \sin \theta_4) \\
\theta'_2 &= \arcsin (\tfrac{n_1}{n_2} \, \sin \theta_2)     &\theta_5 &= \theta'_4 + \alpha_1 - \tfrac{1}{2} \alpha_2 \\
\theta_3 &= \theta'_2 - \alpha_2
\end{align}$$

The ray deviation angle is given by $\delta = \theta_0 - \theta_5$.

== Triplet ==
The double-Amici prism is a symmetric form of the more general triplet prism, in which the apex angles and glasses of the two outer elements may differ (see the figure at right). Although triplet prisms are rarely found in optical systems, their added degrees of freedom beyond the double-Amici design allow for improved dispersion linearity. The deviation angle of the triplet prism is obtained by concatenating the refraction equations at each interface:

A triplet prism, showing the apex angles ($\alpha_1$, $\alpha_2$, and $\alpha_3$) of the three elements, and the angles of incidence $\theta_i$ and refraction $\theta'_i$ at each interface.

$$\begin{align}
\theta_1 &= \theta_0 + \alpha_1 + \tfrac{1}{2} \alpha_2      &\theta'_3 &= \arcsin (\tfrac{n_2}{n_3} \, \sin \theta_3) \\
\theta'_1 &= \arcsin (\tfrac{1}{n_1} \, \sin \theta_1) \quad &\theta_4 &= \theta'_3 - \alpha_3 \\
\theta_2 &= \theta'_1 - \alpha_1                             &\theta'_4 &= \arcsin (n_3 \, \sin \theta_4) \\
\theta'_2 &= \arcsin (\tfrac{n_1}{n_2} \, \sin \theta_2)     &\theta_5 &= \theta'_4 + \alpha_3 + \tfrac{1}{2} \alpha_2 \\
\theta_3 &= \theta'_2 - \alpha_2
\end{align}$$

Here to the ray deviation angle is given by $\delta = \theta_0 - \theta_5$.

== See also ==
- Dispersive prism
