= N-slit interferometer =

The N-slit interferometer is an extension of the double-slit interferometer also known as Young's double-slit interferometer. One of the first known uses of N-slit arrays in optics was illustrated by Newton. In the first part of the twentieth century, Michelson described various cases of N-slit diffraction.

Feynman described thought experiments the explored two-slit quantum interference of electrons, using Dirac's notation. This approach was extended to N-slit interferometers, by Duarte and colleagues in 1989, using narrow-linewidth laser illumination, that is, illumination by indistinguishable photons. The first application of the N-slit interferometer was the generation and measurement of complex interference patterns. These interferograms are accurately reproduced, or predicted, by the N-slit interferometric equation for either even (N = 2, 4, 6,...), or odd (N = 3, 5, 7,...), numbers of slits.

== N-slit laser interferometer ==
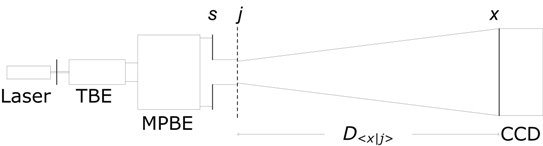
Top view schematics of the N-slit interferometer: TBE is a telescopic beam expander, MPBE is a multiple-prism beam expander. The N-slit array is at j (with the slits perpendicular to the beam expansion) and the interferometric plane is at x where the digital detector is positioned. The intra interferometric distance D has been reported to be as large as 527 m. Note: N-slit interferometers include three-slit interferometers (or triple-slit interferometers), four-slit interferometers, etc.

The N-slit laser interferometer, introduced by Duarte, uses prismatic beam expansion to illuminate a transmission grating, or N-slit array, and a photoelectric detector array (such as a CCD or CMOS) at the interference plane to register the interferometric signal. The expanded laser beam illuminating the N-slit array is single-transverse-mode and narrow-linewidth. This beam can also take the shape, via the introduction of a convex lens prior to the prismatic expander, of a beam extremely elongated in the propagation plane and extremely thin in the orthogonal plane. This use of one-dimensional (or line) illumination eliminates the need of point-by-point scanning in microscopy and microdensitometry. Thus, these instruments can be used as straight forward N-slit interferometers or as interferometric microscopes.

The disclosure of this interferometric configuration introduced the use of digital detectors to N-slit interferometry.

== Applications ==
=== Secure optical communications ===
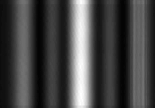
Interferogram for N = 3 slits with diffraction pattern superimposed on the right outer wing. This particular interferogram corresponds to the interferometric character "b".

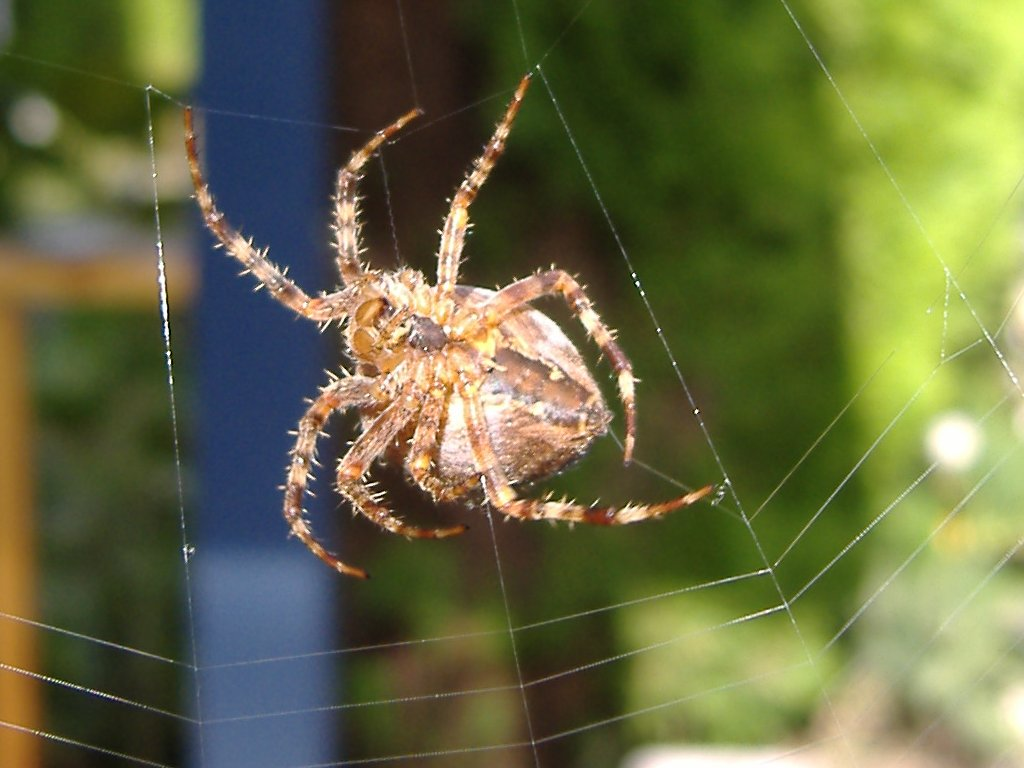
The diffraction pattern over the interferogram shown above, corresponding to N = 3 slits, was generated using a single spider silk fiber with a diameter of about 25 μm.

These interferometers, originally introduced for applications in imaging, are also useful in optical metrology and have been proposed for secure optical communications in free space, between spacecraft. This is due to the fact that propagating N-slit interferograms suffer catastrophic collapse from interception attempts using macroscopic optical methods such as beam splitting. Recent experimental developments include terrestrial intra-interferometric path lengths of 35 meters and 527 meters.

These large, and very large, N-slit interferometers are used to study various propagation effects including microscopic disturbances on propagating interferometric signals. This work has yielded the first observation of diffraction patterns superimposed over propagating interferograms.

These diffraction patterns (as shown in the first photograph) are generated by inserting a spider web fiber (or spider silk thread) into the propagation path of the interferogram. The position of the spider web fiber is perpendicular to the propagation plane.

=== Clear air turbulence ===
N-slit interferometers, using large intra interferometric distances, are detectors of clear air turbulence. The distortions induced by clear air turbulence upon the interferometric signal are different, in both character and magnitude, from the catastrophic collapse resulting from attempted interception of optical signals using macroscopic optical elements.

=== Expanded beam interferometric microscopy ===
The original application of the N-slit laser interferometer was interferometric imaging. In particular, the one dimensionally expanded laser beam (with a cross section 25-50 mm wide by 10-25 μm high) was used to illuminate imaging surfaces (such as silver-halide films) to measure the microscopic density of the illuminated surface. Hence the term interferometric microdensitometer. Resolution down to the nano regime can be provided via the use of interinterferometric calculations. When used as a microdensitometer the N-slit interferometer is also known as a laser microdensitometer.

The multiple-prism expanded laser beam is also described as an extremely elongated laser beam. The elongated dimension of the beam (25-50 mm) is in the propagation plane while the very thin dimension (in the μm regime) of the beam is in the orthogonal plane. This was demonstrated, for imaging and microscopy applications, in 1993. Alternative descriptions of this type of extremely elongated illumination include the terms line illumination, linear illumination, thin light sheet illumination (in light sheet microscopy), and plane illumination (in selective plane illumination microscopy).

=== Other applications ===
N-slit interferometers are of interest to researchers working in atom optics, Fourier imaging, optical computing, and quantum computing.

== See also ==
- Beam expander
- Clear air turbulence
- Diffraction from slits
- Double-slit experiment
- Free-space optical communication
- Laser communication in space
- Microscopy
- Microdensitometer
- N-slit interferometric equation
- List of laser articles
