= Rainbow gravity theory =

Physics theory

The rainbow gravity theory suggests that gravity affects different wavelengths in the same way that a prism affects light.

Rainbow gravity (or "gravity's rainbow") is a theory that different wavelengths of light experience different gravity levels and are separated in the same way that a prism splits white light into the rainbow. This phenomenon would be imperceptible in areas of relatively low gravity, such as Earth, but would be significant in areas of extremely high gravity, such as a black hole. As such the theory claims to disprove that the universe has a beginning or Big Bang, as the big bang theory calls for all wavelengths of light to be impacted by gravity to the same extent. The theory was first proposed in 2003 by physicists Lee Smolin and João Magueijo, and claims to bridge the gap between general relativity and quantum mechanics. Scientists are currently attempting to detect rainbow gravity using the Large Hadron Collider.

== Background ==
Rainbow gravity theory's origin is largely the product of the disparity between general relativity and quantum mechanics. More specifically, "locality," or the concept of cause and effect that drives the principles of general relativity, is mathematically irreconcilable with quantum mechanics. This issue is due to incompatible functions between the two fields; in particular, the fields apply radically different mathematical approaches in describing the concept of curvature in four-dimensional space-time. Historically, this mathematical split begins with the disparity between Einstein's theories of relativity, which saw physics through the lens of causality, and classical physics, which interpreted the structure of space-time to be random and inherent.

The prevailing notion about cosmic change is that the universe is expanding at a constantly accelerating rate; moreover, it is understood that as one traces the universe's history backwards one finds that it was, at one point, far denser. If true, the rainbow gravity theory prohibits a singularity such as that which is postulated in the Big Bang. This indicates that, when viewed in reverse, the universe slowly approaches a point of terminal density without ever reaching it, implying that the universe does not possess a point of origin.

== Criticism ==
There are stringent constraints on energy-dependent speed-of-light scenarios. Based on these, Sabine Hossenfelder has strongly criticised the rainbow gravity concept, stating that "It is neither a theory nor a model, it is just an idea that, despite more than a decade of work, never developed into a proper model. rainbow gravity has not been shown to be compatible with the standard model. There is no known quantization of this approach and one cannot describe interactions in this framework at all. Moreover, it is known to lead to non-localities which are ruled out already. For what I am concerned, no papers should get published on the topic until these issues have been resolved."

== See also ==
- Steady-state model
- Eternal inflation
- Cyclic model
