= Prism compressor =

Optical device for shortening laser pulses

Figure 1. A prism compressor. The red lines represent rays of longer wavelengths and the blue lines those of shorter wavelengths. The spacing of the red, green, and blue wavelength components after the compressor is drawn to scale. This setup has a positive dispersion.

A prism compressor is an optical device used to shorten the duration of a positively chirped ultrashort laser pulse by giving different wavelength components a different time delay. It typically consists of two prisms and a mirror. Figure 1 shows the construction of such a compressor. Although the dispersion of the prism material causes different wavelength components to travel along different paths, the compressor is built such that all wavelength components leave the compressor at different times, but in the same direction. If the different wavelength components of a laser pulse were already separated in time, the prism compressor can make them overlap with each other, thus causing a shorter pulse.

Prism compressors are typically used to compensate for dispersion inside Ti:sapphire modelocked lasers. Each time the laser pulse inside travels through the optical components inside the laser cavity, it becomes stretched. A prism compressor inside the cavity can be designed such that it exactly compensates this intra-cavity dispersion. It can also be used to compensate for dispersion of ultrashort pulses outside laser cavities.

Prismatic pulse compression was first introduced, using a single prism, in 1983 by Dietel et al. and a four-prism pulse compressor was demonstrated in 1984 by Fork et al. Additional experimental developments include a prism-pair pulse compressor and a six-prism pulse compressor for semiconductor lasers. The multiple-prism dispersion theory, for pulse compression, was introduced in 1982 by Duarte and Piper, extended to second derivatives in 1987, and further extended to higher order phase derivatives in 2009.

An additional compressor, using a large prism with lateral reflectors to enable a multi-pass arrangement at the prism, was introduced in 2006.

== Principle of operation ==
Figure 2. Geometry of a prism compressor

Figure 3. Effective pathlength for a prism compressor with A = 100 mm, θ = 55°, and α = 10°. The colors correspond to different values of B, where B = 67.6 mm means that the beam barely hits the tips of both prisms at refractive index 1.6. (The colors do not correspond to those of the rays in Figure 1.)

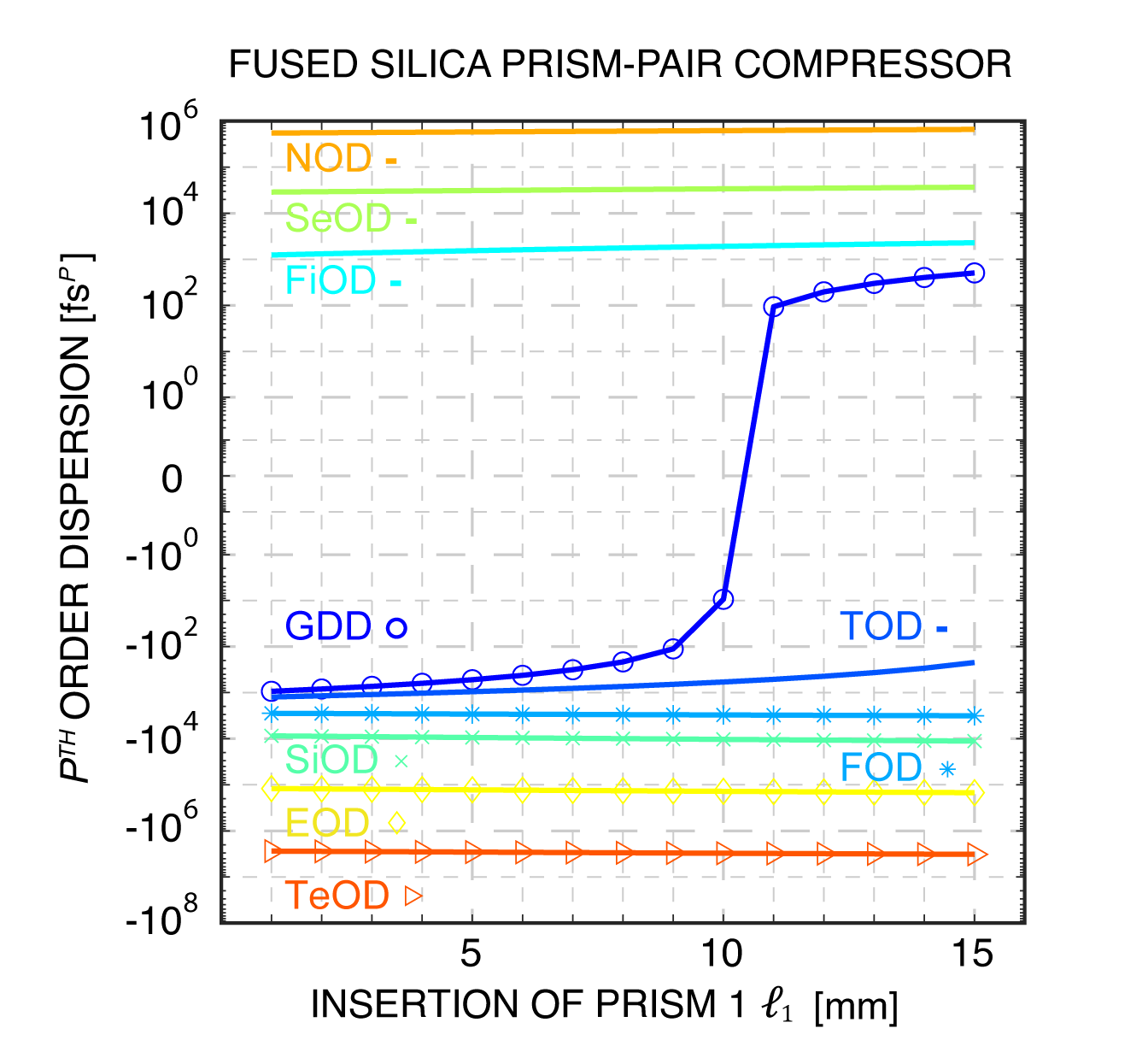
Figure 4. Dispersion orders of a fused silica prism-pair compressor at 780nm. (p = 2 - GDD, p = 3 - TOD, p = 4 - FOD, p = 5 - FiOD, p = 6 - SiOD, p = 7 - SeOD, p = 8 - EOD, p = 9 - NOD, p = 10 - TeOD)

Almost all optical materials that are transparent for visible light have a normal, or positive, dispersion: the refractive index decreases with increasing wavelength. This means that longer wavelengths travel faster through these materials. The same is true for the prisms in a prism compressor. However, the positive dispersion of the prisms is offset by the extra distance that the longer wavelength components have to travel through the second prism. This is a rather delicate balance, since the shorter wavelengths travel a larger distance through air. However, with a careful choice of the geometry, it is possible to create a negative dispersion that can compensate positive dispersion from other optical components. This is shown in Figure 3. By shifting prism P2 up and down, the dispersion of the compressor can be both negative around refractive index n = 1.6 (red curve) and positive (blue curve). The range with a negative dispersion is relatively short since prism P2 can only be moved upwards over a short distance before the light ray misses it altogether.

In principle, the α angle can be varied to tune the dispersion properties of a prism compressor. In practice, however, the geometry is chosen such that the incident and refracted beam have the same angle at the central wavelength of the spectrum to be compressed. This configuration is known as the "angle of minimum deviation", and is easier to align than arbitrary angles.

The refractive index of typical materials such as BK7 glass changes only a small amount (0.01 – 0.02) within the few tens of nanometers that are covered by an ultrashort pulse. Within a practical size, a prism compressor can only compensate a few hundred μm of path length differences between the wavelength components. However, by using a large refractive index material (such as SF10, SF11, etc.) the compensation distance can be extended to mm level. This technology has been used successfully inside femtosecond laser cavity for compensation of the Ti:sapphire crystal, and outside for the compensation of dispersion introduced by other elements. However, high-order dispersion will be introduced by the prism compressor itself, as well as other optical elements. It can be corrected with careful measurement of the ultrashort pulse and compensate the phase distortion. MIIPS is one of the pulse shaping techniques which can measure and compensate high-order dispersion automatically. As a muddled version of pulse shaping the end mirror is sometimes tilted or even deformed, accepting that the rays do not travel back the same path or become divergent.

In Figure 4, the characteristics of the dispersion orders of a prism-pair compressor made of fused silica are depicted as a function of the insertion depth of the first prism, denoted as $\ell_1$, for laser pulses with a central wavelength of $780 \text{ nm}$ and spectral bandwidth $\Delta \lambda = 30 \text{ nm}$. The assessment employs the Lah-Laguerre optical formalism — a generalized formulation of the high orders of dispersion. The compressor is evaluated at near the Brewster angle for a separation of $L = 30 \text{ cm}$ between the prisms, an insertion depth for the second prism $\ell_2 = \text{1 mm}$ at the minimum wavelength $\lambda_{min}$, and an apex angle of $\alpha = 69.06^\circ$ for the fused silica prisms.

=== Dispersion theory ===
The angular dispersion for generalized prismatic arrays, applicable to laser pulse compression, can be calculated exactly using the multiple-prism dispersion theory. In particular, the dispersion, its first derivative, and its second derivative, are given by

$$\nabla_{n}\phi_{2,m} = H_{2,m} + (M^{-1})\bigg(H_{1,m} \pm \nabla_{n}\phi_{2,(m-1)}\bigg)$$

$$\nabla_{n}^2\phi_{2,m} = \nabla_{n}H_{2,m} + (\nabla_{n}M^{-1})\bigg(H_{1,m} \pm \nabla_{n}\phi_{2,(m-1)}\bigg)+(M^{-1})\bigg(\nabla_{n}H_{1,m} \pm \nabla_{n}^2\phi_{2,(m-1)}\bigg)$$

$$\nabla_{n}^3\phi_{2,m} = \nabla_{n}^2H_{2,m} + (\nabla_{n}^2M^{-1})\bigg(H_{1,m} \pm \nabla_{n}\phi_{2,(m-1)}\bigg)+2(\nabla_{n}M^{-1})\bigg(\nabla_{n}H_{1,m} \pm \nabla_{n}^2\phi_{2,(m-1)}\bigg)+(M^{-1})\bigg(\nabla_{n}^2H_{1,m} \pm \nabla_{n}^3\phi_{2,(m-1)}\bigg)$$

where

$$\nabla_{n}= \partial/\partial n$$

$$\,M=k_{1,m}k_{2,m}$$

$$\,k_{1,m}=\cos\psi_{1,m}/\cos\phi_{1,m}$$

$$\,k_{2,m}=\cos\phi_{2,m}/\cos\psi_{2,m}$$

$$\,H_{1,m}=(\tan\phi_{1,m})/n_m$$

$$\,H_{2,m}=(\tan\phi_{2,m})/n_m$$

Angular quantities are defined in the article for the multiple-prism dispersion theory and higher derivatives are given by Duarte.

== Comparison with other pulse compressors ==
The most common other pulse compressor is based on gratings (see Chirped pulse amplification), which can easily create a much larger negative dispersion than a prism compressor (centimeters rather than tenths of millimeters). However, a grating compressor has losses of at least 30% due to higher-order diffraction and absorption losses in the metallic coating of the gratings. A prism compressor with an appropriate anti-reflection coating can have less than 2% loss, which makes it a feasible option inside a laser cavity. Moreover, a prism compressor is cheaper than a grating compressor.

Another pulse compression technique uses chirped mirrors, which are dielectric mirrors that are designed such that the reflection has a negative dispersion. Chirped mirrors are difficult to manufacture; moreover the amount of dispersion is rather small, which means that the laser beam must be reflected a number of times in order to achieve the same amount of dispersion as with a single prism compressor. This means that it is hard to tune. On the other hand, the dispersion of a chirped-mirror compressor can be manufactured to have a specific dispersion curve, whereas a prism compressor offers much less freedom. Chirped-mirror compressors are used in applications where pulses with a very large bandwidth have to be compressed.

== See also ==
- Chirped pulse amplification
- Ti:sapphire laser
- Modelocking
- Ultrashort pulse
- MIIPS, a technique to calibrate and correct the high-order distortion of femtosecond laser pulse.
- Multiple-prism dispersion theory
