= Beam expander =

Optical devices treating collimated light

Beam expanders are optical devices that take a collimated beam of light and expand its width (or, used in reverse, reduce its width).

In laser physics they are used either as intracavity or extracavity elements. They can be telescopic in nature or prismatic. Generally prismatic beam expanders use several prisms and are known as multiple-prism beam expanders.

Telescopic beam expanders include refracting and reflective telescopes. A refracting telescope commonly used is the Galilean telescope which can function as a simple beam expander for collimated light. The main advantage of the Galilean design is that it never focuses a collimated beam to a point, so effects associated with high power density such as dielectric breakdown are more avoidable than with focusing designs such as the Keplerian telescope. When used as intracavity beam expanders, in laser resonators, these telescopes provide two-dimensional beam expansion in the 20–50 range.

In tunable laser resonators intracavity beam expansion usually illuminates the whole width of a diffraction grating. Thus beam expansion reduces the beam divergence and enables the emission of very narrow linewidths which is a desired feature for many analytical applications including laser spectroscopy.

== Multiple-prism beam expanders ==
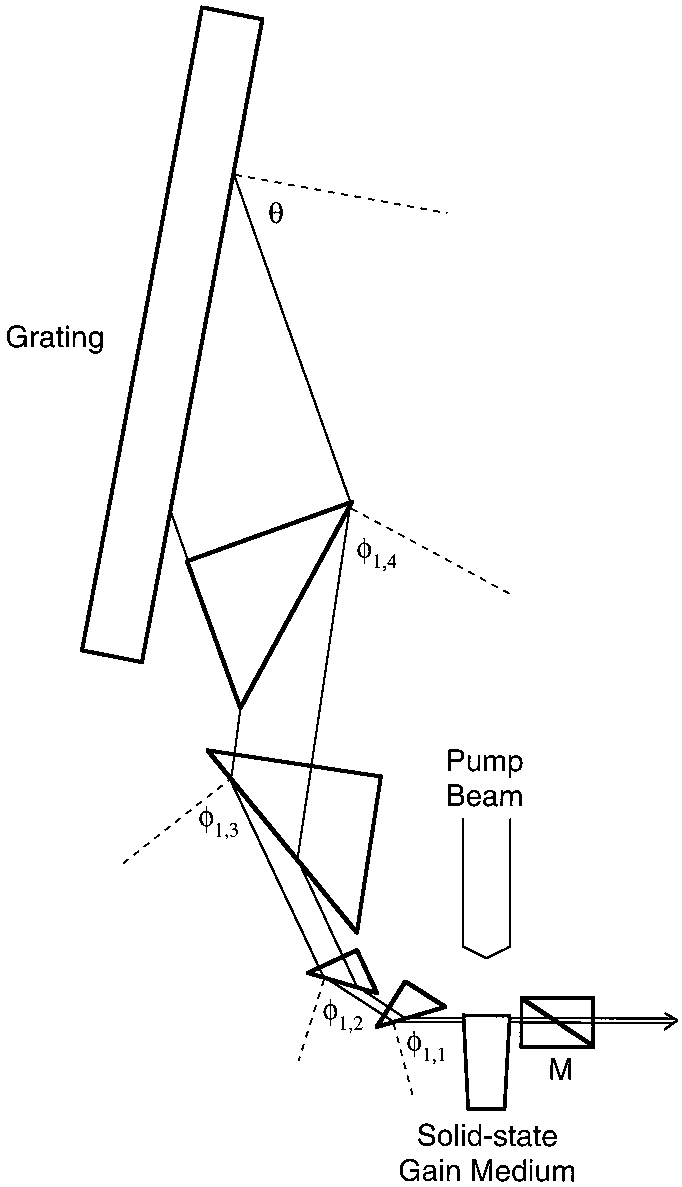
Long-pulse tunable laser oscillator utilizing a multiple-prism beam expander

Isaac Newton was the first to describe the use of prisms as beam expanders and in multiple-prism arrays. Multiple-prism beam expanders usually deploy two to five prisms to yield large one-dimensional beam expansion factors. Designs applicable to tunable lasers with beam expansion factors of up to 200 have been disclosed in the literature. Initially multiple-prism grating configurations were introduced in narrow-linewidth liquid dye lasers but eventually were also adopted in gas, solid-state, and diode laser designs. The generalized mathematical description of multiple-prism beam expanders, introduced by F. J. Duarte, is known as the multiple-prism dispersion theory.

Multiple-prism beam expanders and arrays can also be described using ray transfer matrices. The multiple-prism dispersion theory is also available in 4 × 4 matrix form. These matrix equations are applicable either to prism pulse compressors or multiple-prism beam expanders.

== Extra-cavity beam shaping ==
Extra cavity hybrid beam transformers: using a telescopic beam expander, followed by a convex lens, followed by a multiple-prism beam expander, a laser beam (with a circular cross section) can be transformed into an extremely elongated beam, in the plane of propagation, while extremely thin in the orthogonal plane. The resulting plane illumination, with a near one-dimensional (or line) cross section, eliminates the need of point-by-point scanning and has become important for applications such as N-slit interferometry, microdensitometry, and microscopy. This type of illumination can also be known in the literature as light sheet illumination or selective plane illumination.

== See also ==
- Laser communication in space
- Microdensitometer
- Multiple-prism dispersion theory
- Multiple-prism grating laser oscillators
- N-Slit interferometer
- Ray transfer matrix analysis
