= Polarization rotator =

Optical device which rotates the polarization axis of polarized light

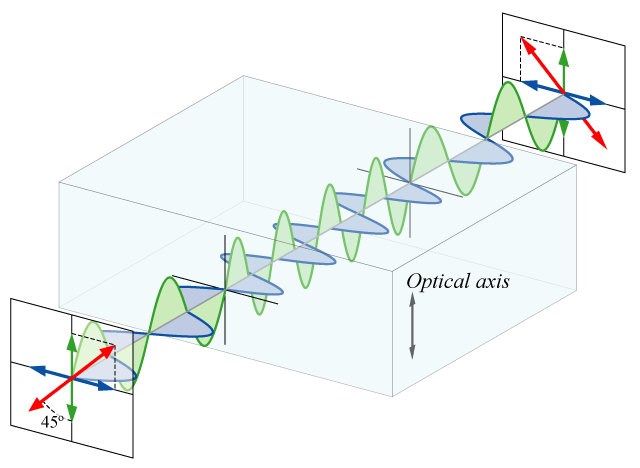
A half-wave plate rotates polarization by 90°

A polarization rotator is an optical device that rotates the polarization axis of a linearly polarized light beam by an angle of choice. Such devices can be based on the Faraday effect, on birefringence, or on total internal reflection. Rotators of linearly polarized light have found widespread applications in modern optics since laser beams tend to be linearly polarized and it is often necessary to rotate the original polarization to its orthogonal alternative.

== Faraday rotators ==
A Faraday rotator consists of an optical material in a magnetic field. When light propagates in the material, interaction with the magnetic field causes left- and right-handed circularly polarized waves to propagate with slightly different phase velocities. Since a linearly-polarized wave can be described as a superposition of left- and right-handed circularly polarized waves, the difference in phase velocity causes the polarization direction of a linearly-polarized wave to rotate as it propagates through the material. The direction of the rotation depends on whether the light is propagating with or against the direction of the magnetic field: a rotation induced by passing through the material is not undone by passing through it in the opposite direction. This can be used to make an optical isolator.

== Birefringent rotators ==
Half-wave plates and quarter-wave plates alter the polarization of light due to the principle of birefringence. Their performance is wavelength-specific; a fact that may be a limitation. Switchable wave plates can also be manufactured out of liquid crystals, ferro-electric liquid crystals, or magneto-optic crystals. These devices can be used to rapidly change the angle of polarization in response to an electric signal, and can be used for rapid polarization state generation (PSG) or polarization state analysis (PSA) with high accuracy. In particular, the PSG and PSA made with magneto-optic (MO) switches have been successfully used to analyze polarization mode dispersion (PMD) and polarization dependent loss (PDL) with accuracies not obtainable with rotating waveplate methods, thanks to the binary nature of the MO switches. Furthermore, MO switches have also been successfully adopted to generate differential group delay for PMD compensation and PMD emulation applications.

== Prism rotators ==
Broadband prismatic polarization rotator

Prism rotators use multiple internal reflections to produce beams with rotated polarization. Because they are based on total internal reflection, they are broadband—they work over a broad range of wavelengths.

Double Fresnel rhomb
A double Fresnel rhomb rotates the linear polarization axis by 90° using four internal reflections. A disadvantage may be a low ratio of useful optical aperture to length.
Broadband prismatic rotator
A broadband prismatic rotator rotates the linear polarization by 90° using seven internal reflections to induce collinear rotation, as shown in the diagram. The polarization is rotated in the second reflection, but that leaves the beam in a different plane and at a right angle relative to the incident beam. The other reflections are necessary to yield a beam with its polarization rotated and collinear with the input beam. These rotators are reported to have transmission efficiencies better than 94%.

== See also ==
- Optical rotation
