= Rhodamine 123 =

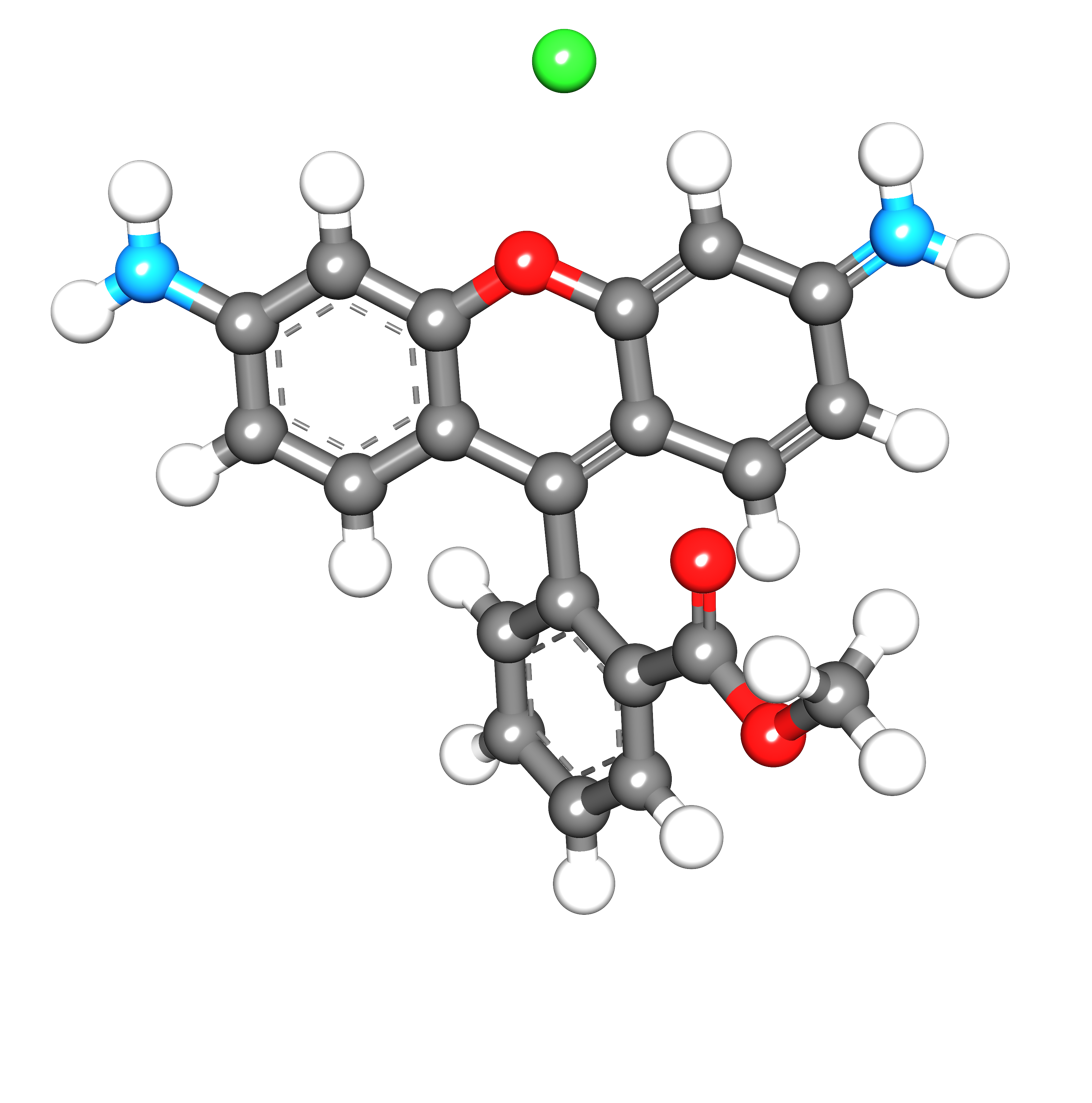

Names
- Preferred IUPAC name 7-Amino-10-[2-(methoxycarbonyl)phenyl]-2H-xanthene-2-iminium chloride
- Other names Rhodamine 123, EINECS 263-687-8, RH 123, LS-162564, C11190

Identifiers
CAS Number	62669-70-9
3D model (JSmol)	Interactive image
ChEMBL	ChEMBL176049
ChemSpider	13726662
ECHA InfoCard	100.057.879
EC Number	263-687-8
PubChem CID	9929799
UNII	1N3CZ14C5O
CompTox Dashboard (EPA)	DTXSID90910785 DTXSID00886503, DTXSID90910785
- InChI: InChI=1S/C21H17N2O3.ClH/c1-25-21(24)15-5-3-2-4-14(15)20-16-8-6-12(22)10-18(16)26-19-11-13(23)7-9-17(19)20;/h2-11H,22-23H2,1H3;1H/q+1;/p-1 Key: TUFFYSFVSYUHPA-UHFFFAOYSA-M; InChI=1/C21H17N2O3.ClH/c1-25-21(24)15-5-3-2-4-14(15)20-16-8-6-12(22)10-18(16)26-19-11-13(23)7-9-17(19)20;/h2-11H,22-23H2,1H3;1H/q+1;/p-1 Key: TUFFYSFVSYUHPA-REWHXWOFAU
- SMILES: [Cl-].COC(=O)c4ccccc4c1c3ccc(N)cc3[o+]c2cc(N)ccc12

Properties
Chemical formula	C_{21}H_{17}ClN_{2}O_{3}
Molar mass	380.824
Melting point	235 °C (455 °F; 508 K)
Solubility in ethanol	20 g/l

Hazards
- GHS labelling
Pictograms	(GHS07: Exclamation mark)
Signal word	Warning
Hazard statements	H302
Precautionary statements	P264, P270, P301+P312, P330, P501
- Except where otherwise noted, data are given for materials in their standard state (at 25 °C [77 °F], 100 kPa). verify (what is ?) Infobox references

Rhodamine 123 /ˈroʊdəmiːn/ is a chemical compound and a dye. It is often used as a tracer dye within water to determine the rate and direction of flow and transport. Rhodamine dyes fluoresce and can thus be detected easily and inexpensively with instruments called fluorometers. Rhodamine dyes are used extensively in biotechnology applications such as fluorescence microscopy, flow cytometry, fluorescence correlation spectroscopy and ELISA. Rhodamine fluorescence can also be used as a measure of membrane polarization in live cell assays both within mitochondria and with bacteria. This use relies on the fact that rhodamine 123 accumulates in membranes in a manner which is dependent on membrane polarization.

The absorption of rhodamine 123 peaks around 505 nm and luminescence is tunable around 560 nm when used as a laser dye. Its luminescence quantum yield is 0.90.

== See also ==
- Dye laser
- Laser dyes
- Rhodamine
- Rhodamine B
- Rhodamine 6G
