= C28H31ClN2O3 =

The molecular formula C_{28}H_{31}ClN_{2}O_{3} (molar mass: 479.010 g/mol, exact mass: 478.2023 u) may refer to:

- Rhodamine 6G
- Rhodamine B
