= Organic photonics =

Technical application of optics using organic materials

Molecular structure of the Rhodamine 6G dye which is often used to dope a polymer such as PMMA to create a solid-state organic gain medium.

PMMA repeating unit.

Organic photonics is a subfield of photonics (the technical application of optics) in which light is manipulated via organic materials.

Fields within organic photonics include the liquid organic dye laser and organic solid-state dye lasers. Materials used in solid-state dye lasers include:

- laser dye-doped PMMA
- laser dye-doped ormosil
- laser dye-doped polymer-nanoparticle matrices
- laser dye-doped bio-based gain media

Organic-inorganic nanoparticle gain media are nanocomposites developed for solid-state dye lasers and can also be used in biosensors, bioanalytics, and nonlinear organic photonics applications.

An additional class of organic materials used in the generation of laser light include organic semiconductors. Conjugated polymers are widely used as optically pumped organic semiconductors.

== See also ==
- Conjugated polymers
- Nonlinear optics
- Organic laser
- Organic semiconductor
- Polymer
- Nanoparticle
- Photonics
