= Organic laser =

Laser that uses a carbon-based material as the gain medium

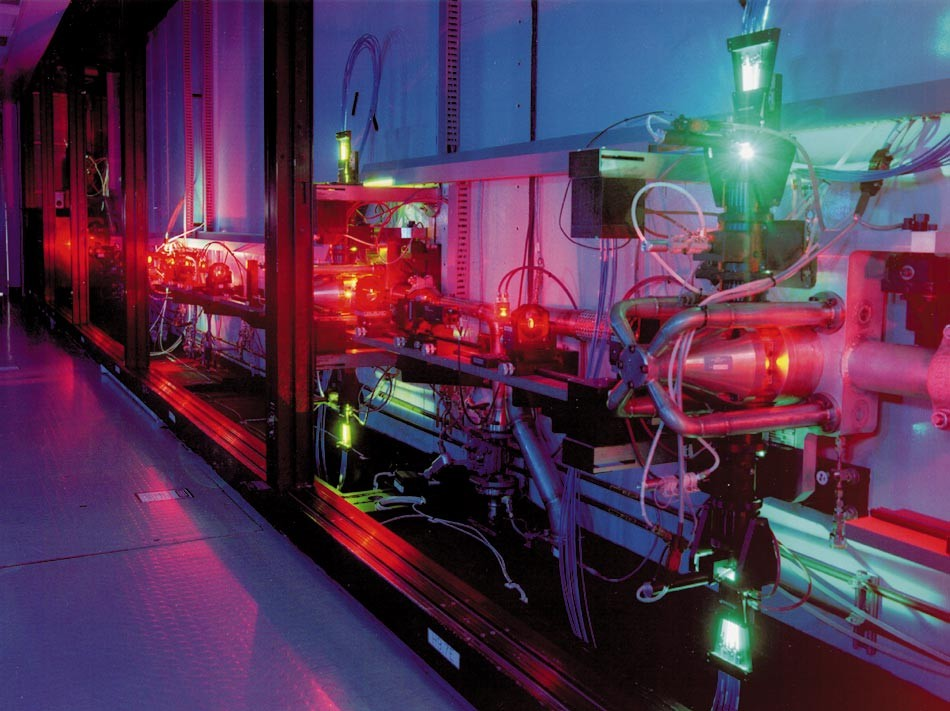
Liquid organic dye laser system excited by a copper vapor laser

An organic laser is a laser which uses an organic (carbon based) material as the gain medium. The first organic laser was the liquid dye laser. These lasers use laser dye solutions as their gain media.

Organic lasers are inherently tunable and when configured as optimized multiple-prism grating laser oscillators can yield efficient single-transverse mode, and single-longitudinal-mode, emission with laser linewidths as narrow as 350 MHz (approximately 0.0004 nm at a wavelength of 590 nm), in the high-power pulsed regime.

== Solid-state dye lasers ==
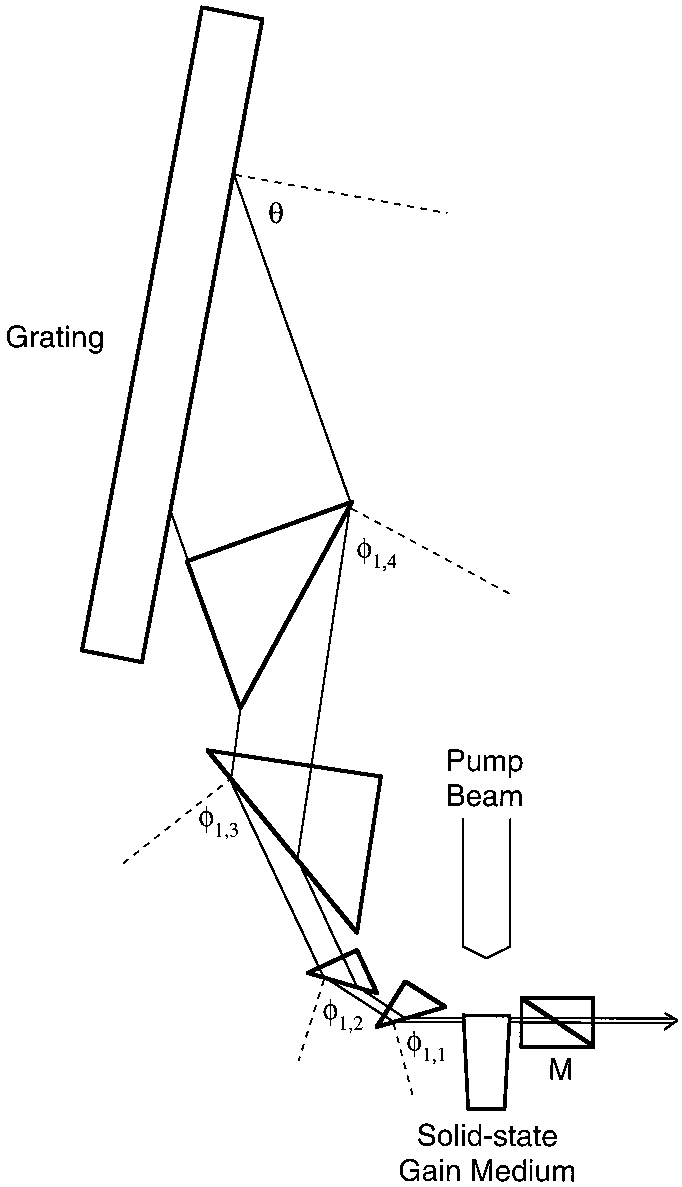
Organic solid-state narrow-linewidth tunable dye laser oscillator using a dye-doped polymer as gain medium

Solid-state dye lasers are organic tunable lasers that use a variety of organic gain media, such as laser dye-doped polymers (DDP), laser dye-doped ormosil (DDO), and laser dye-doped polymer-nanoparticle (DDPN) matrices.

DDO and DDPN gain media are subsets of a larger class of organic-inorganic hybrid materials used as laser matrices.

== Organic semiconductor laser ==
Other types of solid-state organic lasers include the organic semiconductor lasers that use conjugated polymers as gain media. These semiconductor materials can also be configured as "neat films."

Coherent emission, characterized via high-visibility double-slit interferograms (V ~ 0.9) and near diffraction-limited beam divergence, has been reported from electrically pumped coumarin dye-doped tandem OLED devices.

== Distributed feedback laser ==
Organic lasers are also available in distributed feedback configurations and distributed feedback waveguides.

== See also ==
- Nanoparticle
- Organic photonics
- Organic semiconductor
- Solid-state dye laser
