= Mary Spaeth =

American physicist

Mary L. Spaeth
- Born: 1940 (age 85–86)
- Education: Wayne State University; Valparaiso University
- Scientific career
- Workplaces: National Ignition Facility; Hughes Aircraft Company

Mary Louise Spaeth (born 1940) is an American physicist and innovator who is one of the inventors of the tunable dye laser. Spaeth was the Chief Technology Officer at the start of the National Ignition Facility. She was inducted into the Lawrence Livermore National Laboratory Entrepreneurs’ Hall of Fame in 2022.

== Early life and education ==
Spaeth studied physics and mathematics at Valparaiso University. She moved to Wayne State University for graduate studies, and graduated in 1962.

== Research and career ==
Spaeth started her career at Hughes Aircraft Company, where she became interested in laser physics. She became frustrated by the fact that lasers emit monochromatic laser light, which meant they could not be tuned for specific functions. Peter Sorokin at IBM demonstrated that organic dyes could make appropriate absorbers for Q-switching ruby lasers, and went on to investigate its fluorescence. At the time, Spaeth had been reading papers about the dyes used for the development of photographs. She studied the molecular energy transfer processes involved with photographic development. The excited state geometries of these photographic dyes were similar to their ground states, which indicated strong absorption and the potential for population inversion. Spaeth recognised that molecules possessed a high number of rotational states, which would increase their gain bandwidth and could allow for wavelength tuning. She put the dye molecules in a laser cavity and pumped them with a ruby laser, eventually obtaining an emission wavelength that depended on the cell length and mirror spacing. By 1966, Spaeth had invented the tunable dye laser.

Spaeth was involved with the development of tunable dye lasers, and their exploitation in atomic vapor laser isotope separation. In 1974, she joined the Lawrence Livermore National Laboratory, where she explored the use of tunable dye lasers for uranium enrichment. Her work was adopted by the United States Enrichment Corporation (which became Centrus Energy). She was made Chief Technology Officer at the National Ignition Facility (NIF). Spaeth was Lead Systems Engineer during the construction of NIF, which made use of innovations in precision, accuracy and optical components. Spaeth ensured the commissioning, installation and acceptance of the high energy laser systems. Her innovations led to the creation of the NIF laser ignition driver.

Spaeth was inducted into the Lawrence Livermore National Laboratory Entrepreneurs’ Hall of Fame in 2022.

== Selected publications ==
- Gary J. Linford; Eugene R. Peressini; Walter R. Sooy; Spaeth, Mary (1974). "Very long lasers". Applied Optics. 13 (2): 379–390. Bibcode:1974ApOpt..13..379L. doi:10.1364/ao.13.000379. PMID 20125990. Wikidata Q30977416.
- Spaeth, M. L.; Manes, K. R.; Kalantar, D. H.; Miller, P. E.; Heebner, J. E.; Bliss, E. S.; Spec, D. R.; Parham, T. G.; Whitman, P. K.; Wegner, P. J.; Baisden, P. A.; Menapace, J. A.; Bowers, M. W.; Cohen, S. J.; Suratwala, T. I. (2016). "Description of the NIF Laser". Fusion Science and Technology. 69 (1): 25–145. Bibcode:2016FuST...69...25S. doi:10.13182/fst15-144. Wikidata Q130463519.
- Baisden, P. A.; Atherton, L. J.; Hawley, R. A.; Land, T. A.; Menapace, J. A.; Miller, P. E.; Runkel, M. J.; Spaeth, M. L.; Stolz, C. J.; Suratwala, T. I.; Wegner, P. J.; Wong, L. L. (2016). "Large Optics for the National Ignition Facility". Fusion Science and Technology. 69 (1): 295–351. Bibcode:2016FuST...69..295B. doi:10.13182/fst15-143. Wikidata Q130463557.
