= Rhodamine B =

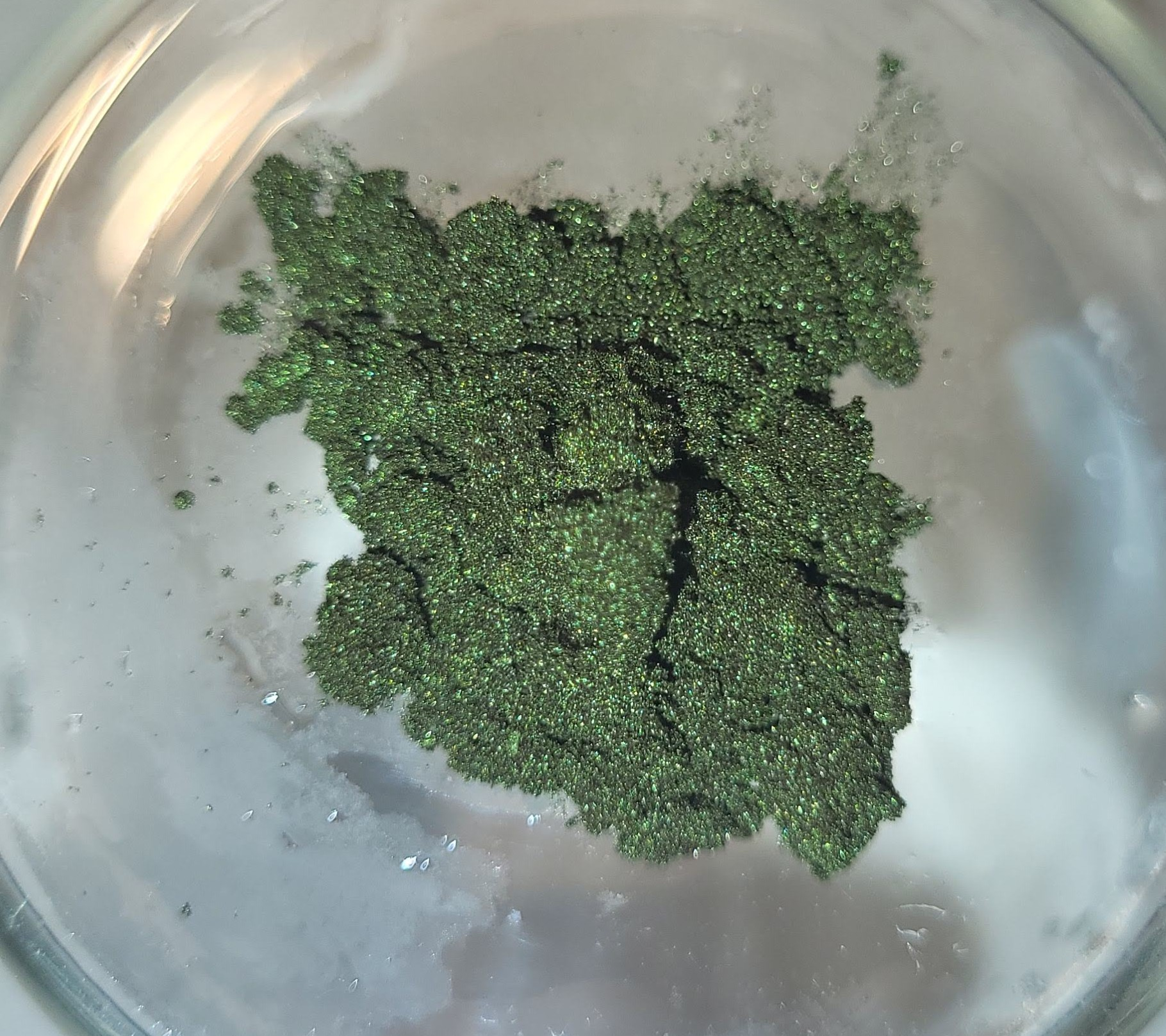

Names
- Preferred IUPAC name 9-(2-Carboxyphenyl)-6-(diethylamino)-N,N-diethyl-3H-xanthen-3-iminium chloride
- Other names Rhodamine 610, C.I. Pigment Violet 1, Basic Violet 10, C.I. 45170

Identifiers
CAS Number	81-88-9
3D model (JSmol)	Interactive image
ChEBI	CHEBI:52334
ChEMBL	ChEMBL428971
ChemSpider	6439
ECHA InfoCard	100.001.259
KEGG	C19517
PubChem CID	6694
UNII	K7G5SCF8IL
CompTox Dashboard (EPA)	DTXSID6042369
- InChI: InChI=1S/C28H30N2O3.ClH/c1-5-29(6-2)19-13-15-23-25(17-19)33-26-18-20(30(7-3)8-4)14-16-24(26)27(23)21-11-9-10-12-22(21)28(31)32;/h9-18H,5-8H2,1-4H3;1H Key: PYWVYCXTNDRMGF-UHFFFAOYSA-N
- SMILES: CCN(CC)C1=CC2=C(C=C1)C(=C3C=CC(=[N+](CC)CC)C=C3O2)C4=CC=CC=C4C(=O)O.[Cl-]

Properties
Chemical formula	C_{28}H_{31}ClN_{2}O_{3}
Molar mass	479.02
Appearance	Green powder
Melting point	210 to 211 °C (410 to 412 °F; 483 to 484 K) (Decomposes)
Solubility in water	8 to 15 g/L (20 °C) (Note: Ellis RC (November 16, 2015). "Reagent and Dye Solubility Chart". IHCWorld. Archived from the original on 30 January 2020. "This is to be used as a guide only as solubility data varies between manufacturers for the same product, especially for dyes." Note that most sources simply indicate that the compound is water soluble without providing a g/L value.)

Hazards
Safety data sheet (SDS)	MSDS
- Except where otherwise noted, data are given for materials in their standard state (at 25 °C [77 °F], 100 kPa). verify (what is ?) Infobox references

Rhodamine B /ˈroʊdəmiːn/ is a chemical compound and a dye. It is often used as a tracer dye within water to determine the rate and direction of flow and transport. Rhodamine dyes fluoresce and can thus be detected easily and inexpensively with fluorometers.

Rhodamine B is used in biology as a staining fluorescent dye, sometimes in combination with auramine O, as the auramine-rhodamine stain to demonstrate acid-fast organisms, notably Mycobacterium. Rhodamine dyes are also used extensively in biotechnology applications such as fluorescence microscopy, flow cytometry, fluorescence correlation spectroscopy and ELISA.

== Other uses ==
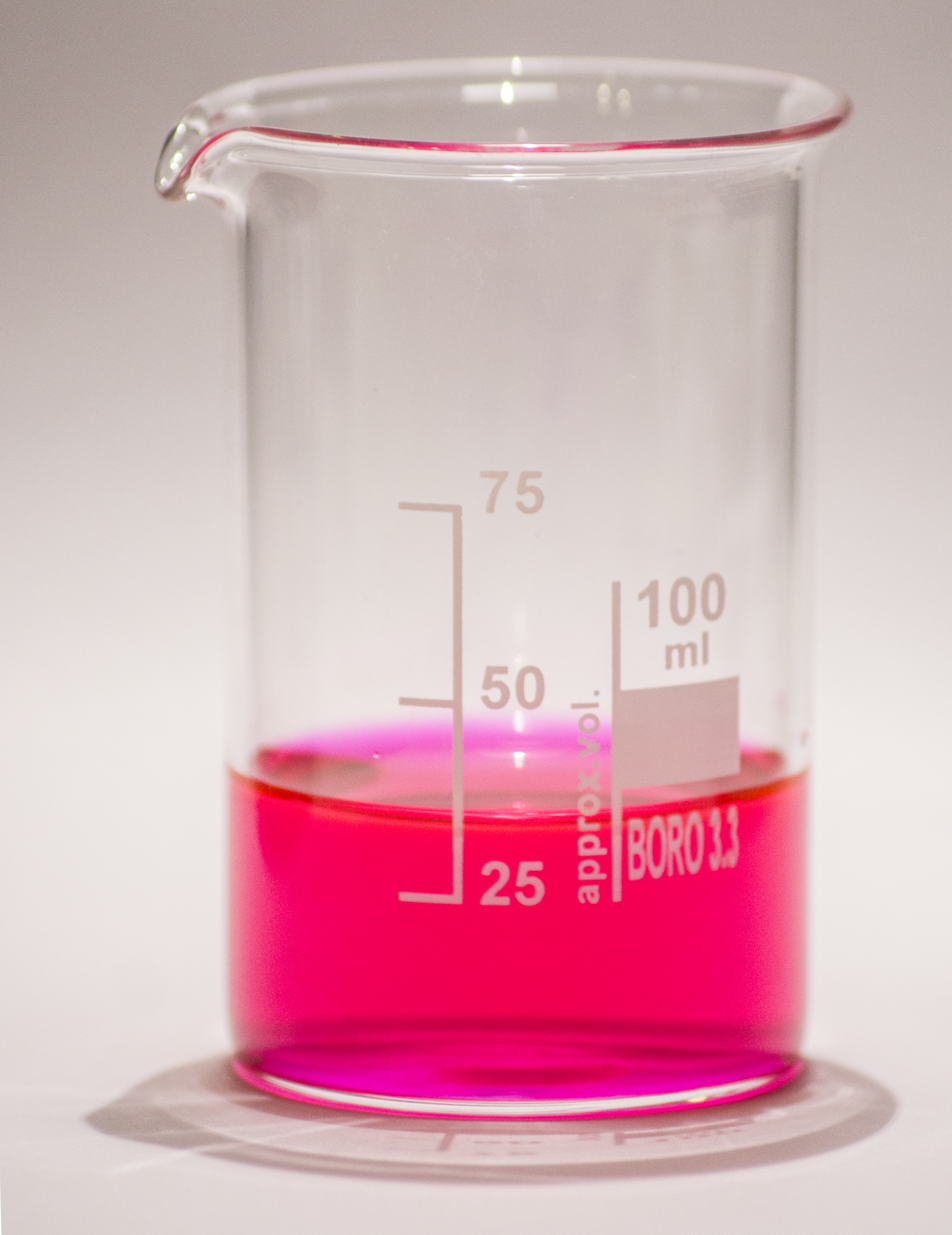
Rhodamine B solution in water

Rhodamine B is often mixed with herbicides to show where they have been used.

It is also being tested for use as a biomarker in oral rabies vaccines for wildlife, such as raccoons, to identify animals that have eaten a vaccine bait. The rhodamine is incorporated into the animal's whiskers and teeth. Rhodamine B is an important hydrophilic xanthene dye well known for its stability and is widely used in the textile industry, leather, paper printing, paint, coloured glass and plastic industries.

Rhodamine B (BV10) is mixed with quinacridone magenta (PR122) to make the bright pink watercolor known as Opera Rose.

== Properties ==
Rhodamine B closed form (A) and open form (B)

Rhodamine B can exist in equilibrium between two forms: an "open"/fluorescent form and a "closed"/nonfluorescent spirolactone form. The "open" form dominates in acidic condition while the "closed" form is colorless in basic condition.

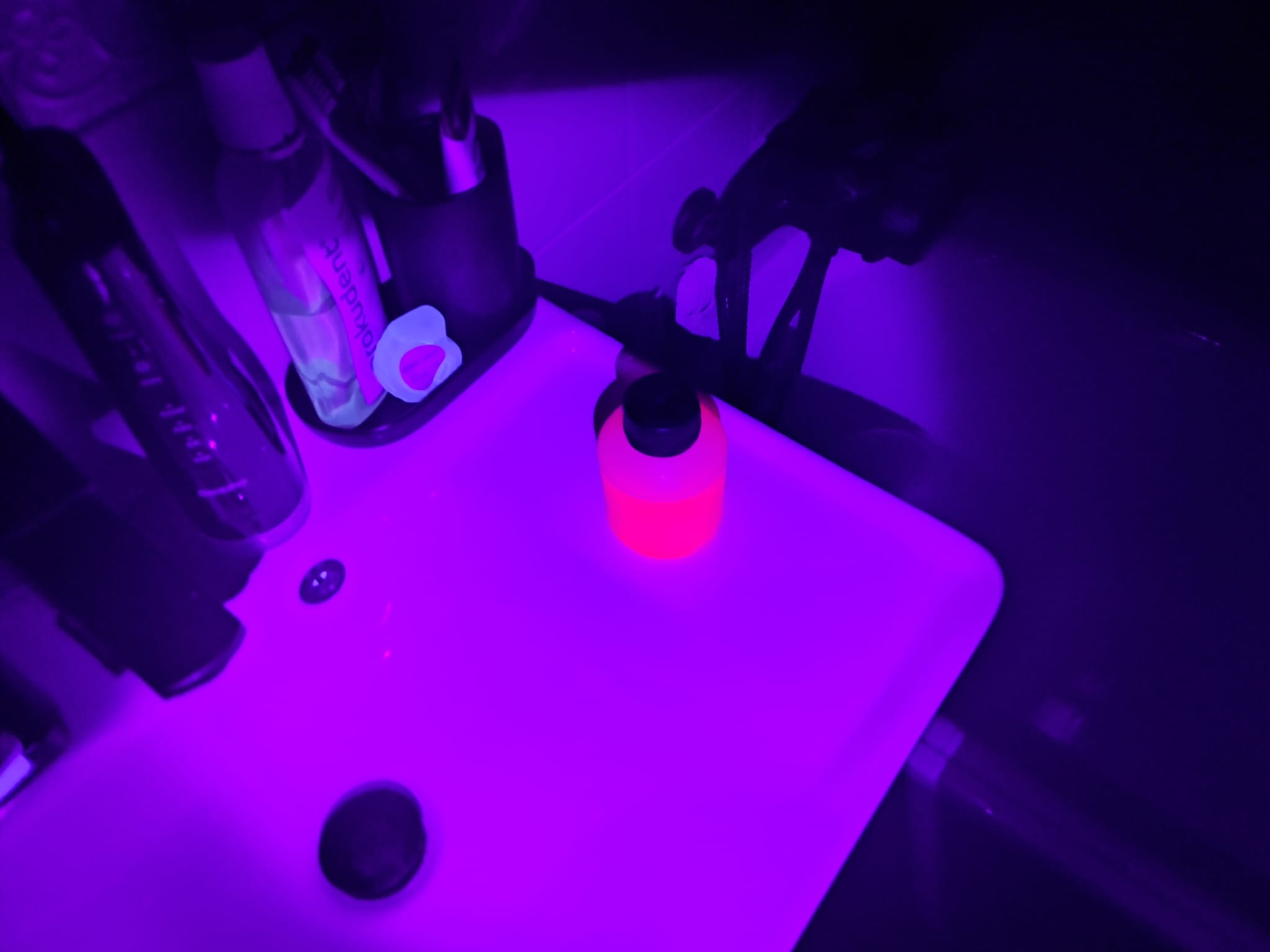
A small amount of aqueous Rhodamine B in a 250 mL bottle

The fluorescence intensity of rhodamine B will decrease as temperature increases.

The solubility of rhodamine B in water varies by manufacturer, and has been reported as 8 g/L and ~15 g/L, while solubility in alcohol (presumably ethanol) has been reported as 15 g/L. Chlorinated tap water decomposes rhodamine B. Rhodamine B solutions adsorb to plastics and should be kept in glass. Rhodamine B is tunable around 610 nm when used as a laser dye. Its luminescence quantum yield is 0.65 in basic ethanol, 0.49 in ethanol, 1.0, and 0.68 in 94% ethanol. The fluorescence yield is temperature dependent; the compound is fluxional in that its excitability is in thermal equilibrium at room temperature.

== Safety and health ==
In California, rhodamine B is suspected to be carcinogenic and thus products containing it must contain a warning on its label. Cases of economically motivated adulteration, where it has been illegally used to impart a red color to chili powder, have come to the attention of food safety regulators.

== See also ==
- Dye laser
- Laser dye
- Rhodamine
- Rhodamine 6G
