= DyLight Fluor =

	Color	mass (g/mol)	Absorb (nm)	Emit (nm)	ε (M^{−1}cm^{−1})
DyLight 350	violet	874	353	432	15,000
DyLight 405	violet	793	400	420	30,000
DyLight 488	green	1011	493	518	70,000
DyLight 550	yellow	982	562	576	150,000
DyLight 594	orange	1078	593	618	80,000
DyLight 633	red	1066	638	658	170,000
DyLight 650	red	1008	654	673	250,000
DyLight 680	far-red	950	692	712	140,000
DyLight 755	near-IR	1092	754	776	220,000
DyLight 800	near-IR	1050	777	794	270,000

The DyLight Fluor family of fluorescent dyes are produced by Dyomics in collaboration with Thermo Fisher Scientific. DyLight dyes are typically used in biotechnology and research applications as biomolecule, cell and tissue labels for fluorescence microscopy, cell biology or molecular biology.

== Applications ==
Historically, fluorophores such as fluorescein, rhodamine, Cy3 and Cy5 have been used in a wide variety of applications. These dyes have limitations for use in microscopy and other applications that require exposure to an intense light source such as a laser, because they photobleach quickly (however, bleaching can be reduced at least 10 fold using oxygen scavenging). DyLight Fluors have comparable excitation and emission spectra and are claimed to be more photostable, brighter, and less pH-sensitive. The excitation and emission spectra of the DyLight Fluor series cover much of the visible spectrum and extend into the infrared region, allowing detection using most fluorescence microscopes, as well as infrared imaging systems.

== Synthesis ==
DyLight Fluors are synthesized through sulfonate addition to coumarin, xanthene (such as fluorescein and rhodamine), and cyanine dyes. Sulfonation makes DyLight dyes negatively charged and hydrophilic. DyLight Fluors are commercially available as reactive succinimidyl-esters for labeling proteins through lysine residues, and as maleimide derivatives for labeling proteins through cysteine residues. Antibodies conjugated are also available from several companies.

== Alternatives ==
Similar lines of fluorescent dyes provide an alternative to the DyLight Dyes (see also the list in Category:Fluorescent dyes).
