= Ormosil =

Organically-modified silica or silicate

Ormosil is a shorthand phrase for organically modified silica or organically modified silicate. In general, ormosils are produced by adding silane to silica-derived gel during the sol-gel process. They are engineered materials that show great promise in a wide range of applications such as:

- alternative to viral vectors for gene delivery, with higher transient transfection efficiencies
- suspension media and substrates for next generation solar cells (quantum dots)and photocatalytic oxidation of water
- matrix material for UV-protection coating
- matrix material for laser dye-doped organic-inorganic solid state dye lasers

This technology has been demonstrated as a nonviral vector to successfully deliver DNA loads to specifically targeted cells in living animals. Confirmation of results demonstrated that new DNA was working and expressed genes in the animal.

== Sono-Ormosil ==
Sono-Ormosils are organically modified silicates, which were prepared by using high-performance ultrasound during the sol-gel process. When high intense ultrasound is introduced in liquid, cavitation is produced. Due to the cavitational shear forces, molecular weight is lowered by particle size reduction and polydispersity is achieved. Multiphase systems are dispersed and emulsified very efficiently, so that very fine mixtures are prepared. This means that ultrasound accelerates the polymerization significantly over conventional stirring. The resulting polymer shows a higher molecular weight with a lower polydispersity. The product is a molecular-scaled composite material with improved mechanical properties. Sono-Ormosils are distinguished in comparison with conventional gels by a higher density as well as improved thermal stability. This may be a result from the higher degree of polymerization.

== See also ==
- Organic laser
- Organic photonics
