= Fritz Peter Schäfer =

German physicist

Fritz Peter Schäfer (15 January 1931 – 25 April 2011) was a German physicist, born in Hersfeld, Hesse-Nassau. He is the co-inventor of the organic dye laser. His book, Dye Lasers, is considered a classic in the field of tunable lasers. In this book the chapter written by Schäfer gives an ample and insightful exposition on organic laser dye molecules in addition to a description on the physics of telescopic, and multiple-prism, tunable narrow-linewidth laser oscillators.

In their original experiment Schäfer and colleagues employed a ruby laser to optically excite various infrared organic dyes. These dyes emitted laser radiation in the 731-835 nm range. Schäfer et al. achieved high power outputs at a bandwidth of approximately 10 nm. Schäfer also experimented with laser dyes in the vapor phase under optical excitation.

In addition to his pioneering work on the dye laser, Schäfer also made important contributions to femtosecond lasers and the application of these lasers in plasma physics.

Schäfer was Director of the Max Planck Institute for Biophysical Chemistry in Göttingen.
