= Rhodamine =

Family of derivatives of xanthene used as dyes, indicators and fluorescent tracers

Rhodamine core structure

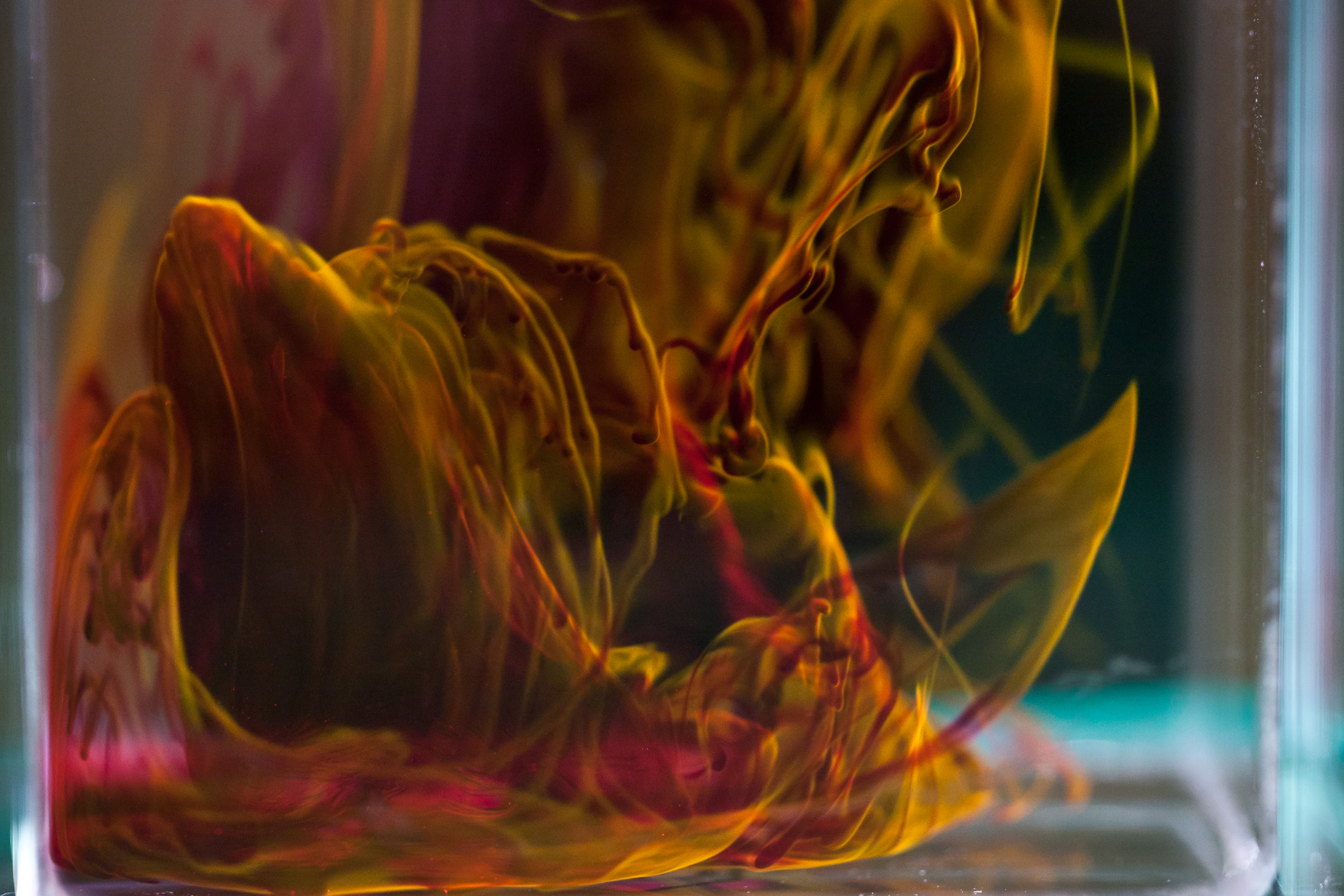
Rhodamine in water

Rhodamine /ˈroʊdəmiːn/ is a family of related dyes, a subset of the triarylmethane dyes. They are derivatives of xanthene. Important members of the rhodamine family are rhodamine 6G, Rhodamin WT, Texas Red (Sulforhodamin 101), rhodamine 123, and rhodamine B. They are mainly used to dye paper and inks, but they lack the lightfastness for fabric dyeing.

== Use ==
Aside from their major applications, they are often used as a tracer dye, e.g. to determine the rate and direction of flow and transport of water. Rhodamine dyes fluoresce and can thus be detected using fluorometers. Rhodamine dyes are used extensively in biotechnology applications such as fluorescence microscopy, flow cytometry, fluorescence correlation spectroscopy and ELISA. Rhodamine 123 is used in biochemistry to inhibit mitochondrion function. Rhodamine 123 appears to bind to the mitochondrial membranes and inhibit transport processes, especially the electron transport chain, thus slowing down cellular respiration. It is a substrate of P-glycoprotein (Pgp), which is usually overexpressed in cancer cells. Recent reports indicate that rhodamine 123 may also be a substrate of multidrug resistance-associated protein (MRP), or more specifically, MRP1.

In addition to their major applications, rhodamines are used in dye laser as gain media.

== Other derivatives ==
There are many rhodamine derivatives used for imaging purposes. For example, carboxytetramethylrhodamine (TAMRA), tetramethylrhodamine (TMR) and its isothiocyanate derivative (TRITC) and sulforhodamine 101 (and its sulfonyl chloride form Texas Red) and Rhodamine Red. TRITC is the base rhodamine molecule functionalized with an isothiocyanate group (−N=C=S), replacing a hydrogen atom on the bottom ring of the structure. This derivative is reactive towards amine groups on proteins inside cells. A succinimidyl-ester functional group attached to the rhodamine core, creating NHS-rhodamine, forms another common amine-reactive derivative.

Other derivatives of rhodamine include newer fluorophores such as Alexa 546, Alexa 633, DyLight 550 and DyLight 633, HiLyte fluor 555 HiLyte 594, Janelia Dyes JF549 and JF669 have been tailored for various chemical and biological applications where higher photostability, increased brightness, different spectral characteristics, or different attachment groups are needed.

Substituents of the xanthene core are influencing the properties of the xanthene dyes by both electronic and steric effects. Specifically designed substituents also allows xanthenes to bear specific functions activatable upon excitation by visible light, e.g. they could act as photoremovable protecting group for carboxylates and halides, carbon monoxide (thus being a photoCORM), or added as a secondary functionality of fluorescent dyes, e.g. fluorescent pH indicators.
