= Peter Sorokin =

Russo-American physicist

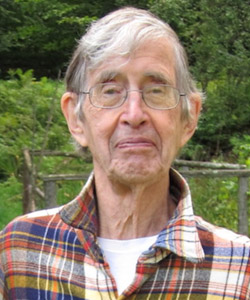
Sorokin in 2015

Peter Pitirimovich Sorokin (Russian: Пётр Питиримович Сорокин, 10 July 1931 – 24 September 2015) was an American Russian physicist and co-inventor of the dye laser. He was born in Boston and grew up in Winchester, Massachusetts. He attended Harvard University, receiving a BA degree in 1952 and a PhD in Applied Physics in 1958; his PhD thesis advisor was Nicolaas Bloembergen.

== Personal life ==
Peter Sorokin was a son of a prominent Russian sociologist Pitirim Sorokin and his wife Microbiologist Dr. Elena Baratynskaya, who belonged to Russian nobility (see: Baratynsky). Sorokin died at the age of 84 on 24 September 2015 from injuries incurred in a fall in August.

== Career ==
Sorokin joined IBM research labs in 1958. In 1960 the first laser, the ruby laser, was developed at Hughes Research Labs by Theodore Maiman. In 1962 Sorokin and Mirek Stevenson produced the second kind of laser using calcium fluoride doped with uranium.

Sorokin and his colleague J. R. Lankard, at IBM, used a ruby laser to excite a near infrared laser dye. Their report was quickly followed by that of F. P. Schäfer. In 1974 Sorokin received the Albert A. Michelson Medal from the Franklin Institute. In 1983 Sorokin was awarded the Comstock Prize in Physics from the National Academy of Sciences and in 1984 the Harvey Prize from Israel's Technion. In 1991 he received the first Arthur L. Schawlow Prize in Laser Science from the American Physical Society. Sorokin became an IBM Fellow in 1968. He was also a Fellow of the Optical Society of America. Toward the end of his career he became interested in astronomy.
