= Copper vapor laser =

Laser using vapors of copper as the lasing medium

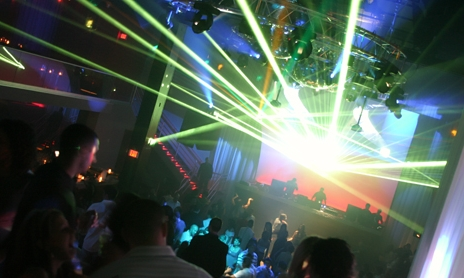
Copper vapor laser

A copper vapor laser (CVL) uses vapors of copper as the lasing medium in a 4-level laser. It produces green laser light at 510.6 nm and yellow laser light at 578.2 nm. The pulse width is typically from 5 to 60 ns, and peak power from 50 to 5000 kW. Its pulse repetition frequencies can be 2 to 100 kHz. The average power of CVLs can range from 25 W to more than 2 kW.

It is one of the lasers that can be home built.

W.T. Walter et al. were first who received laser generation of the copper vapour lasers (Walter W.T., Piltch M., Solimene N., Gould G. Pulsed laser action in atomic copper vapor. Bull. Amer. Phys. Soc., 1966, vol. 11, no. 1, p. 113.). In 1971 A.A.Isaev, M.A.Kazaryan and G.G.Petrash have invented a self-heating concept which allowed to tremendously increase efficiency of the cooper (copper?) vapor laser and start their industrial production. (Isaev A.A., Kazaryan M.A., Petrash G.G. Effective Pulsed Copper-vapor Laser with High Average Generation Power. Zhurnal eksperimental'noi i teoreticheskoi fiziki, 1972, vol. 16, no. 1, pp. 40–42. (English translation: JETP Letters, 1972, vol. 16, iss. 1, pp. 27–29.) http://jetpletters.ru/ps/753/article_11698.pdf ).

Lasers using pure metal vapor produced from an elemental copper source are difficult to construct because of the extremely high temperature, about 1500 °C, necessary to create such vapor, severely limiting the materials for the vapor containment vessel and mirrors. Copper halides, specifically copper chloride, copper bromide and copper iodide, have been substituted since they form vapors at much lower temperatures, in the range 300 °C - 600 °C, but operation at such temperatures remains difficult. Copper compound vapors also increase the complexity of the pump signal applied to the device. Typically, two energizing pulses in quick succession are required, the first to dissociate vapor molecules, and the second to cause the dissociated ions to lase. Operating temperature can be further reduced by the use of copper nitrate or copper acetylacetonate, whose vapors give peak laser output power at 180 °C and 40 °C, respectively.

Using singly ionized species of Cu, research has also demonstrated copper vapor lasers that are CW (continuous-wave), i.e., not pulsed, and lase at deep ultraviolet wavelengths. These lasers can provide average UV powers of several mW and are potentially useful for analytical instruments and spectroscopy.

Copper vapor lasers are used in some machining and laser cutting applications. They can also be used in AVLIS isotope separation systems. In the AVLIS application the copper laser is used to excite tunable dye lasers. A review on copper-laser-pumped dye lasers is given by Webb in High Power Dye Lasers.

== Art and Entertainment ==
A copper vapor laser illuminated an artistic display performed by sculptor Dani Karavan in an arts meeting held in Tel Hai(Israel) in September 1980. The alternating green and yellow moving beams were controlled by S. Kamin using a set of mirrors and chromatic filters.

Copper vapour lasers were first used for entertainment purposes by Pink Floyd on their 1994 tour, supporting their album, The Division Bell.

== See also ==
- List of laser types
