= Dye laser =

Equipment using an organic dye to emit coherent light

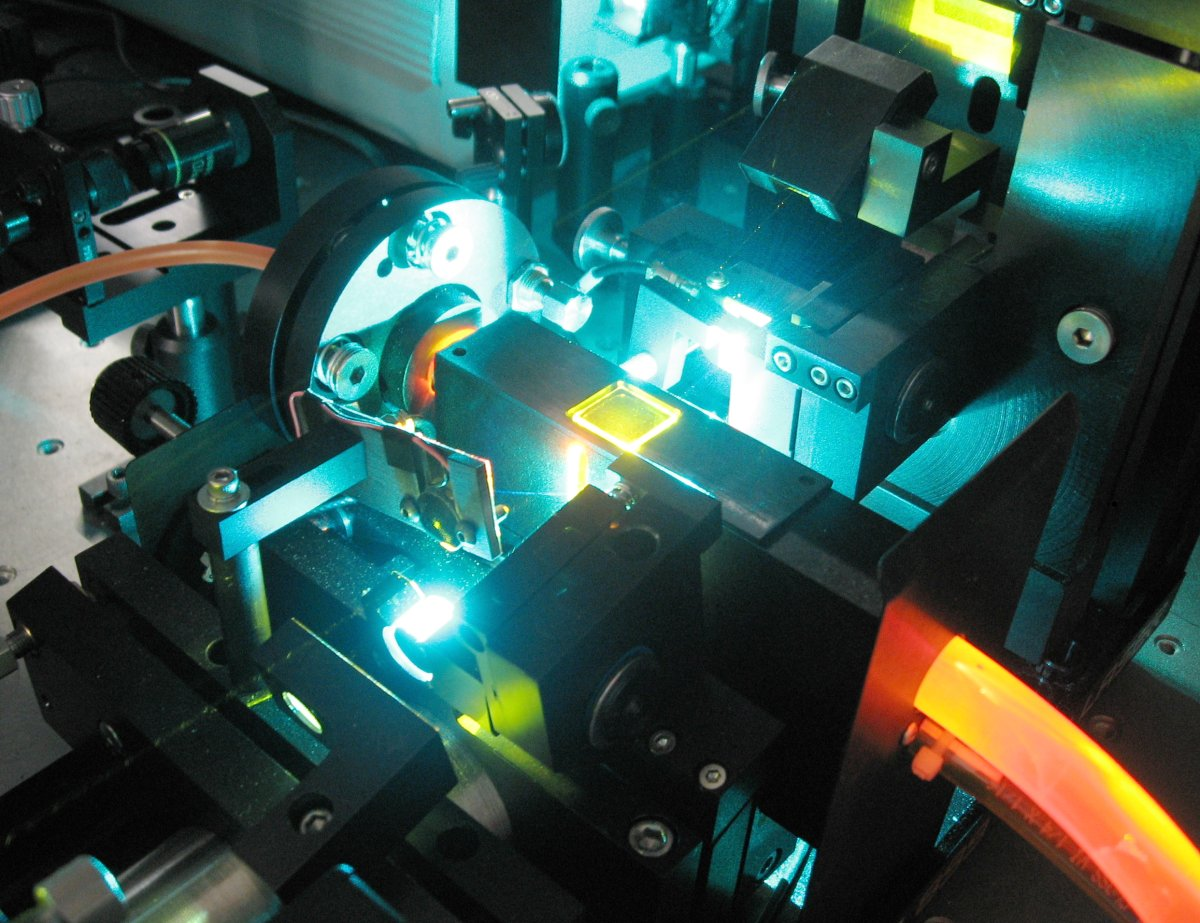
Close-up of a table-top CW dye laser based on rhodamine 6G, emitting at 580 nm (yellow). The emitted laser beam is visible as faint yellow lines between the yellow window (center) and the yellow optics (upper-right), where it reflects down across the image to an unseen mirror, and back into the dye jet from the lower left corner. The orange dye-solution enters the laser from the left and exits to the right, still glowing from triplet phosphorescence, and is pumped by a 514 nm (blue-green) beam from an argon laser. The pump laser can be seen entering the dye jet, beneath the yellow window.

A dye laser is a laser that uses an organic dye as the lasing medium, usually as a liquid solution. Compared to gases and most solid state lasing media, a dye can usually be used for a much wider range of wavelengths, often spanning 50 to 100 nanometers or more. The wide bandwidth makes them particularly suitable for tunable lasers and pulsed lasers. The dye rhodamine 6G, for example, can be tuned from 635 nm (orangish-red) to 560 nm (greenish-yellow), and produce pulses as short as 16 femtoseconds. Moreover, the dye can be replaced by another type in order to generate an even broader range of wavelengths with the same laser, from the near-infrared to the near-ultraviolet, although this usually requires replacing other optical components in the laser as well, such as dielectric mirrors or pump lasers.

Dye lasers were independently discovered by P. P. Sorokin, F. P. Schäfer (and colleagues), and Mary Spaeth in 1966.

In addition to the usual liquid state, dye lasers are also available as solid state dye lasers (SSDL). These SSDL lasers use dye-doped organic matrices as gain medium.

== Construction ==
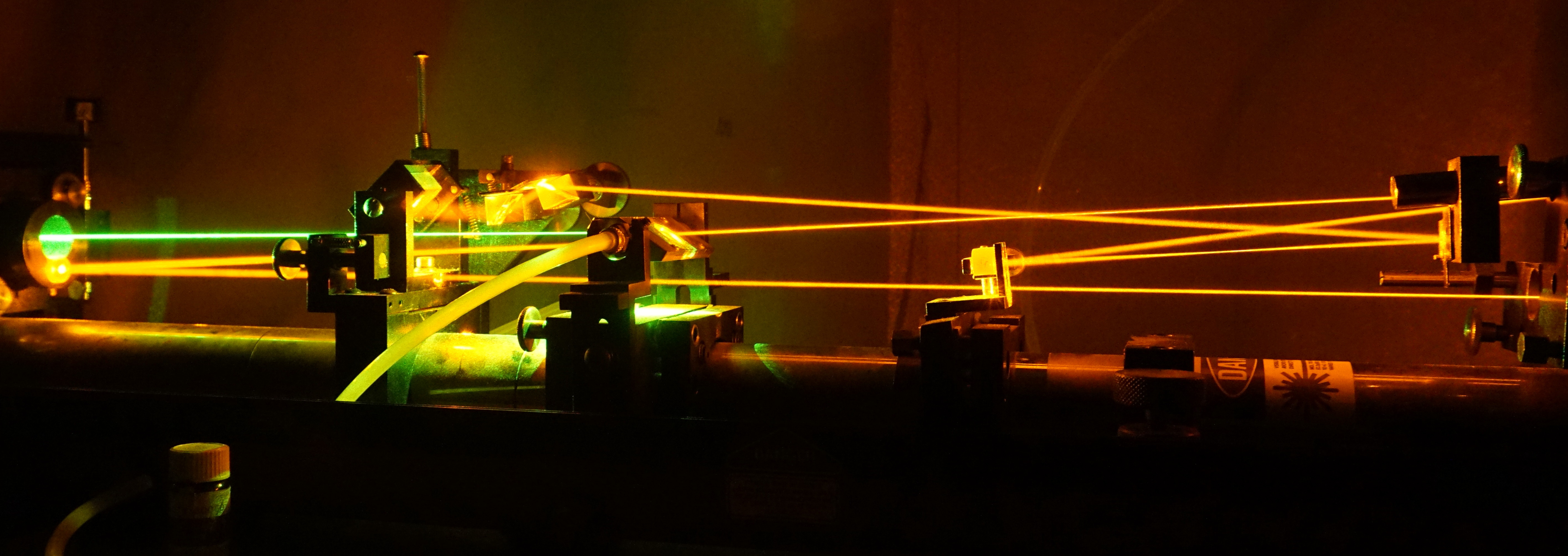
The internal cavity of a linear dye-laser, showing the beam path. The pump laser (green) enters the dye cell from the left. The emitted beam exits to the right (lower yellow beam) through a cavity dumper (not shown). A diffraction grating is used as the high-reflector (upper yellow beam, left side). The two meter beam is redirected several times by mirrors and prisms, which reduce the overall length, expand or focus the beam for various parts of the cavity, and eliminate one of two counter-propagating waves produced by the dye cell. The laser is capable of continuous wave operation or ultrashort picosecond pulses (trillionth of a second, equating to a beam less than 1/3 of a millimeter in length).

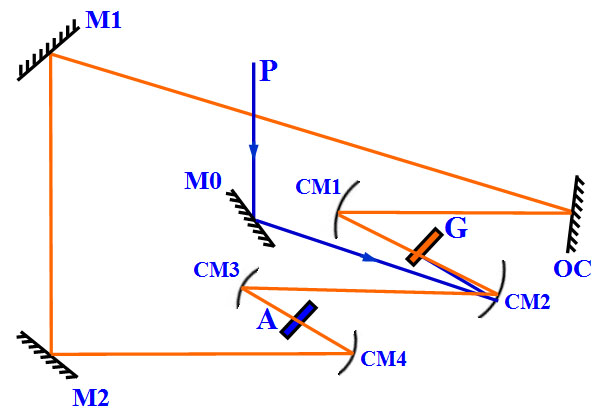
A ring dye laser. P-pump laser beam; G-gain dye jet; A-saturable absorber dye jet; M0, M1, M2-planar mirrors; OC–output coupler; CM1 to CM4-curved mirrors.

A dye laser uses a gain medium consisting of an organic dye, which is a carbon-based, soluble stain that is often fluorescent, such as the dye in a highlighter pen. The dye is mixed with a compatible solvent, allowing the molecules to diffuse evenly throughout the liquid. The dye solution may be circulated through a dye cell, or streamed through open air using a dye jet. A high energy source of light is needed to 'pump' the liquid beyond its lasing threshold. A fast discharge flashtube or an external laser is usually used for this purpose. Mirrors are also needed to oscillate the light produced by the dye's fluorescence, which is amplified with each pass through the liquid. The output mirror is normally around 80% reflective, while all other mirrors are usually more than 99.9% reflective. The dye solution is usually circulated at high speeds, to help avoid triplet absorption and to decrease degradation of the dye. A prism or diffraction grating is usually mounted in the beam path, to allow tuning of the beam.

Because the liquid medium of a dye laser can fit any shape, there are a multitude of different configurations that can be used. A Fabry–Pérot laser cavity is usually used for flashtube pumped lasers, which consists of two mirrors, which may be flat or curved, mounted parallel to each other with the laser medium in between. The dye cell is often a thin tube approximately equal in length to the flashtube, with both windows and an inlet/outlet for the liquid on each end. The dye cell is usually side-pumped, with one or more flashtubes running parallel to the dye cell in a reflector cavity. The reflector cavity is often water cooled, to prevent thermal shock in the dye caused by the large amounts of near-infrared radiation which the flashtube produces. Axial pumped lasers have a hollow, annular-shaped flashtube that surrounds the dye cell, which has lower inductance for a shorter flash, and improved transfer efficiency. Coaxial pumped lasers have an annular dye cell that surrounds the flashtube, for even better transfer efficiency, but have a lower gain due to diffraction losses. Flash pumped lasers can be used only for pulsed output applications.

A ring laser design is often chosen for continuous operation, although a Fabry–Pérot design is sometimes used. In a ring laser, the mirrors of the laser are positioned to allow the beam to travel in a circular path. The dye cell, or cuvette, is usually very small. Sometimes a dye jet is used to help avoid reflection losses. The dye is usually pumped with an external laser, such as a nitrogen, excimer, or frequency doubled Nd:YAG laser. The liquid is circulated at very high speeds, to prevent triplet absorption from cutting off the beam. Unlike Fabry–Pérot cavities, a ring laser does not generate standing waves which cause spatial hole burning, a phenomenon where energy becomes trapped in unused portions of the medium between the crests of the wave. This leads to a better gain from the lasing medium.

== Operation ==
The dyes used in these lasers contain rather large organic molecules which fluoresce. Most dyes have a very short time between the absorption and emission of light, referred to as the fluorescence lifetime, which is often on the order of a few nanoseconds. (In comparison, most solid-state lasers have a fluorescence lifetime ranging from hundreds of microseconds to a few milliseconds.) Under standard laser-pumping conditions, the molecules emit their energy before a population inversion can properly build up, so dyes require rather specialized means of pumping. Liquid dyes have an extremely high lasing threshold. In addition, the large molecules are subject to complex excited state transitions during which the spin can be "flipped", quickly changing from the useful, fast-emitting "singlet" state to the slower "triplet" state.

The incoming light excites the dye molecules into the state of being ready to emit stimulated radiation; the singlet state. In this state, the molecules emit light via fluorescence, and the dye is transparent to the lasing wavelength. Within a microsecond or less, the molecules will change to their triplet state. In the triplet state, light is emitted via phosphorescence, and the molecules absorb the lasing wavelength, making the dye partially opaque. Flashlamp-pumped lasers need a flash with an extremely short duration, to deliver the large amounts of energy necessary to bring the dye past threshold before triplet absorption overcomes singlet emission. Dye lasers with an external pump-laser can direct enough energy of the proper wavelength into the dye with a relatively small amount of input energy, but the dye must be circulated at high speeds to keep the triplet molecules out of the beam path. Due to their high absorption, the pumping energy may often be concentrated into a rather small volume of liquid.

Since organic dyes tend to decompose under the influence of light, the dye solution is normally circulated from a large reservoir. The dye solution can be flowing through a cuvette, i.e., a glass container, or be as a dye jet, i.e., as a sheet-like stream in open air from a specially-shaped nozzle. With a dye jet, one avoids reflection losses from the glass surfaces and contamination of the walls of the cuvette. These advantages come at the cost of a more-complicated alignment.

Liquid dyes have very high gain as laser media. The beam needs to make only a few passes through the liquid to reach full design power, and hence, the high transmittance of the output coupler. The high gain also leads to high losses, because reflections from the dye-cell walls or flashlamp reflector cause parasitic oscillations, dramatically reducing the amount of energy available to the beam. Pump cavities are often coated, anodized, or otherwise made of a material that will not reflect at the lasing wavelength while reflecting at the pump wavelength.

A benefit of organic dyes is their high fluorescence efficiency. The greatest losses in many lasers and other fluorescence devices is not from the transfer efficiency (absorbed versus reflected/transmitted energy) or quantum yield (emitted number of photons per absorbed number), but from the losses when high-energy photons are absorbed and reemitted as photons of longer wavelengths. Because the energy of a photon is determined by its wavelength, the emitted photons will be of lower energy; a phenomenon called the Stokes shift. The absorption centers of many dyes are very close to the emission centers. Sometimes the two are close enough that the absorption profile slightly overlaps the emission profile. As a result, most dyes exhibit very small Stokes shifts and consequently allow for lower energy losses than many other laser types due to this phenomenon. The wide absorption profiles make them particularly suited to broadband pumping, such as from a flashtube. It also allows a wide range of pump lasers to be used for any certain dye and, conversely, many different dyes can be used with a single pump laser.

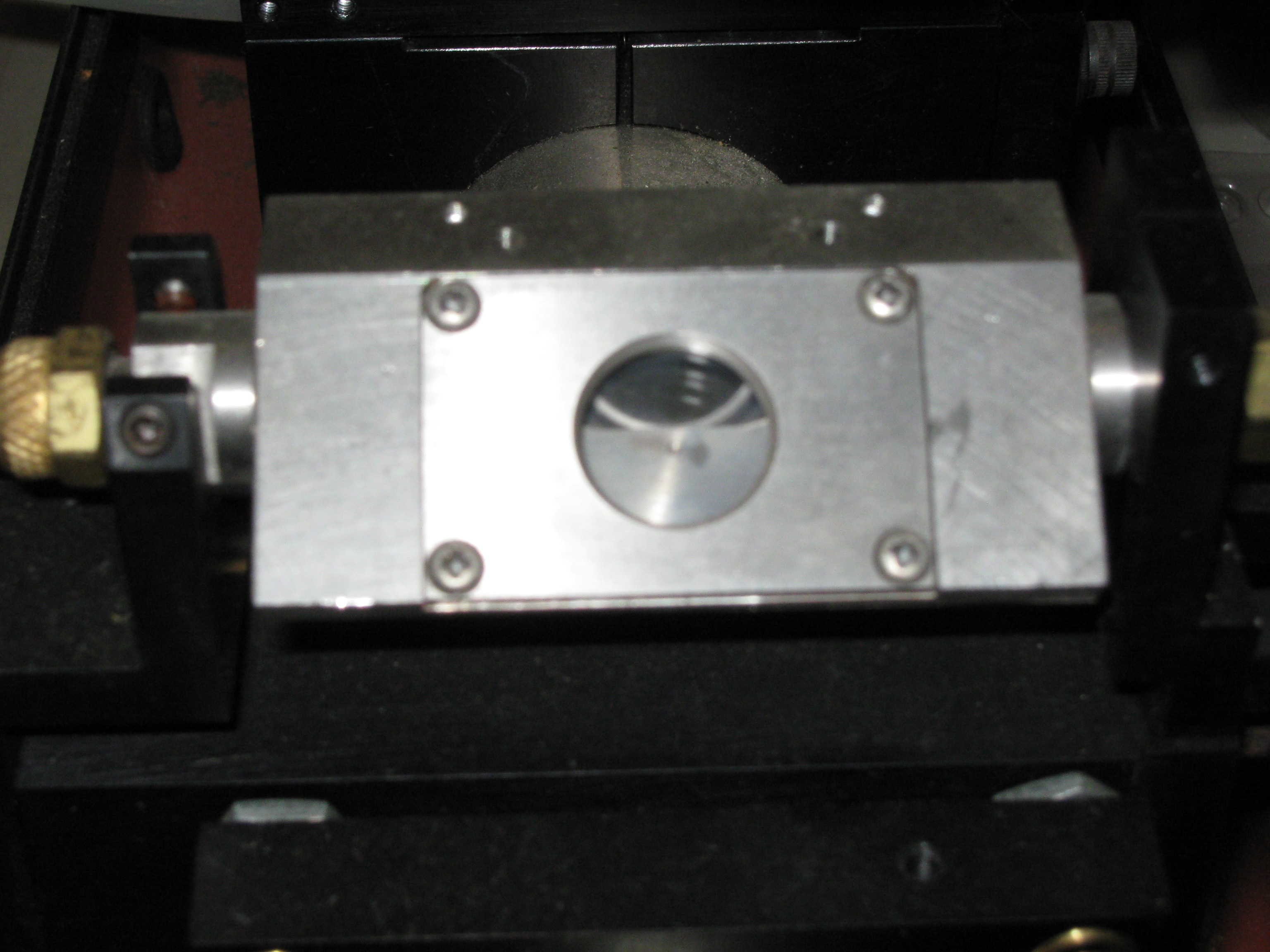
A cuvette used in a dye laser. A thin sheet of liquid is passed between the windows at high speeds. The windows are set at Brewster's angle (air-to-glass interface) for the pump laser, and at Brewster's angle (liquid-to-glass interface) for the emitted beam.

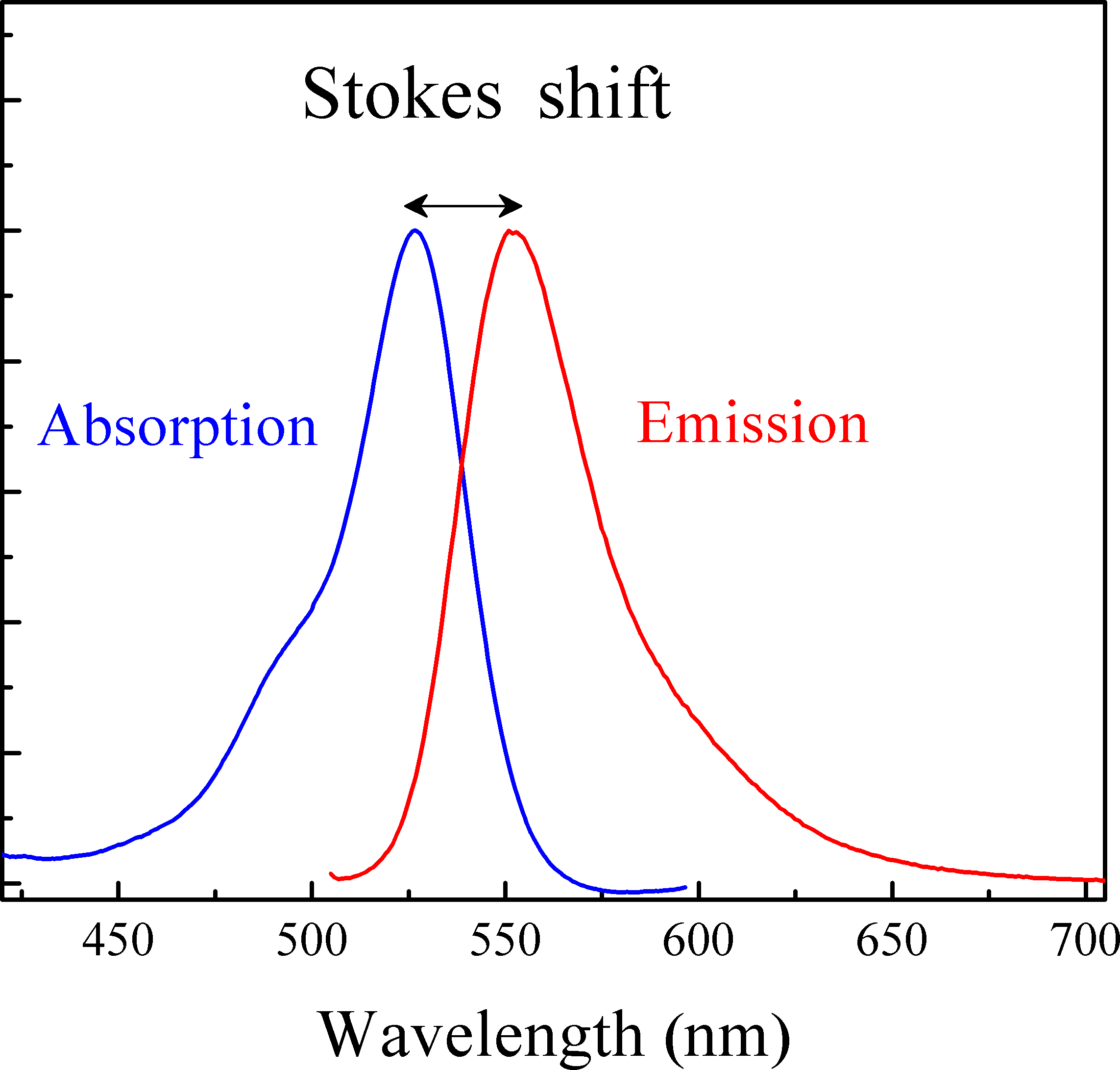
Stokes shift in Rhodamine 6G during broadband absorption/emission. In laser operation, the Stokes shift is the difference between the pump wavelength and the output.

== CW dye lasers ==
Continuous-wave (CW) dye lasers often use a dye jet. CW dye-lasers can have a linear or a ring cavity, and provided the foundation for the development of femtosecond lasers.

== Narrow linewidth dye lasers ==
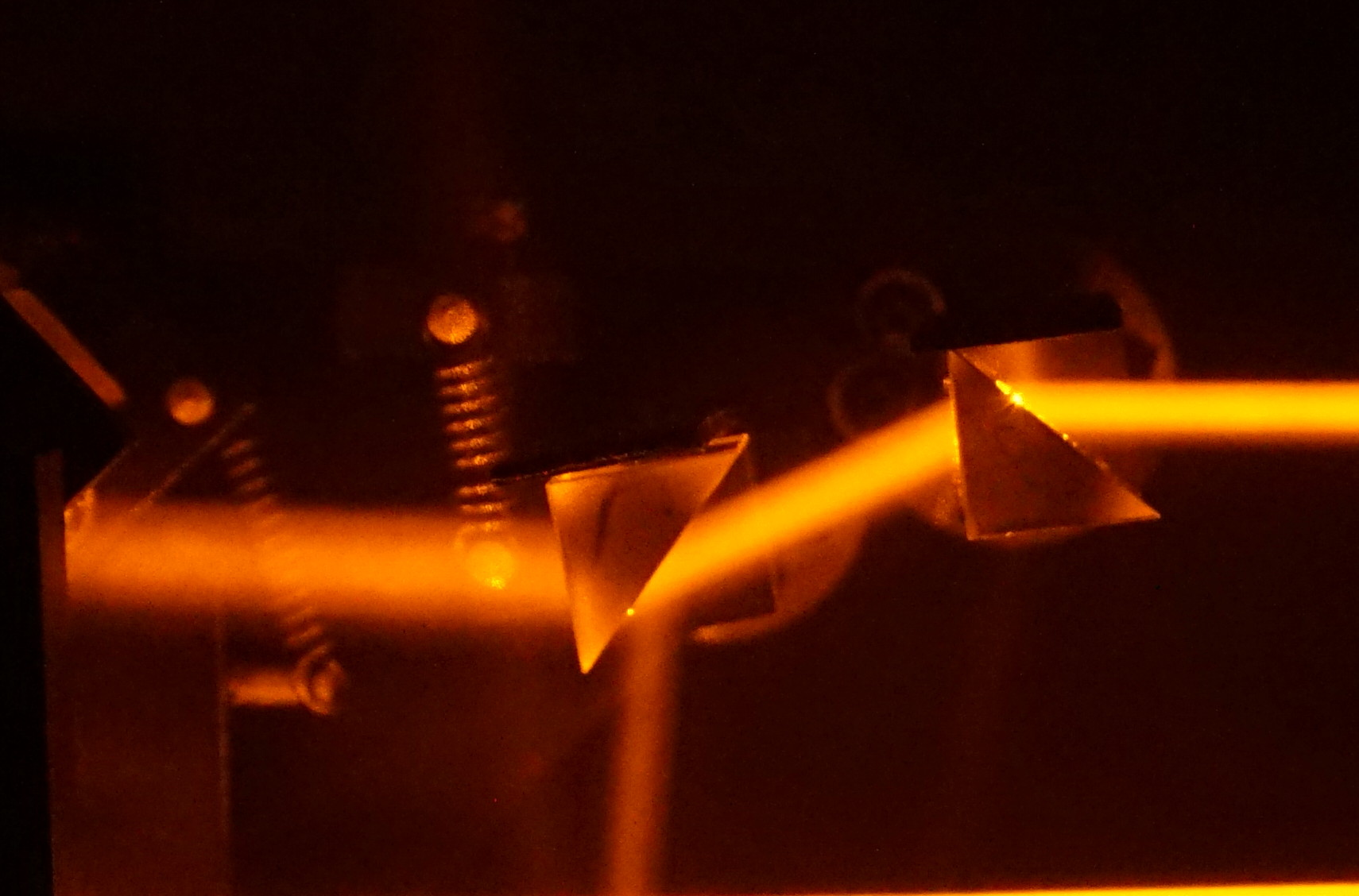
Multiple prisms expand the beam in one direction, providing better illumination of a diffraction grating. Depending on the angle unwanted wavelengths are dispersed, so are used to tune the output of a dye laser, often to a linewidth of a fraction of an angstrom.

Dye lasers' emission is inherently broad. However, tunable narrow linewidth emission has been central to the success of the dye laser. In order to produce narrow bandwidth tuning these lasers use many types of cavities and resonators which include gratings, prisms, multiple-prism grating arrangements, and etalons.

The first narrow linewidth dye laser, introduced by Hänsch, used a Galilean telescope as beam expander to illuminate the diffraction grating. Next were the grazing-incidence grating designs and the multiple-prism grating configurations. The various resonators and oscillator designs developed for dye lasers have been successfully adapted to other laser types such as the diode laser. The physics of narrow-linewidth multiple-prism grating lasers was explained by Duarte and Piper.

== Chemicals used ==
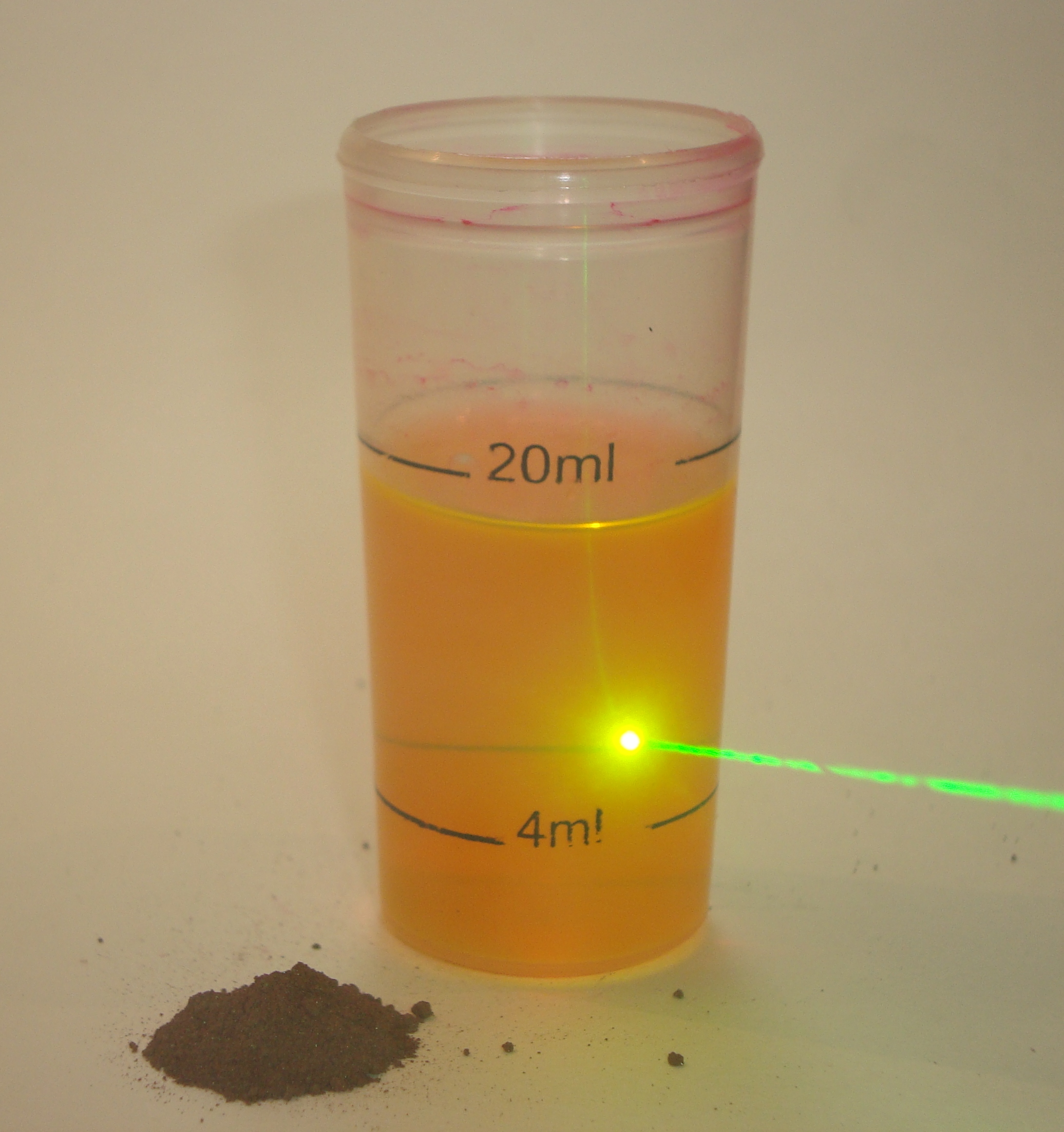
Rhodamine 6G Chloride powder; mixed with methanol; emitting yellow light under the influence of a green laser

Some of the laser dyes are rhodamine (orange, 540–680 nm), fluorescein (green, 530–560 nm), coumarin (blue 490–620 nm), stilbene (violet 410–480 nm), umbelliferone (blue, 450–470 nm), tetracene, malachite green, and others. While some dyes are actually used in food coloring, most dyes are very toxic, and often carcinogenic. Many dyes, such as rhodamine 6G, (in its chloride form), can be very corrosive to all metals except stainless steel. Although dyes have very broad fluorescence spectra, the dye's absorption and emission will tend to center on a certain wavelength and taper off to each side, forming a tunability curve, with the absorption center being of a shorter wavelength than the emission center. Rhodamine 6G, for example, has its highest output around 590 nm, and the conversion efficiency lowers as the laser is tuned to either side of this wavelength.

A wide variety of solvents can be used, although most dyes will dissolve better in some solvents than in others. Some of the solvents used are water, glycol, ethanol, methanol, hexane, cyclohexane, cyclodextrin, and many others. Solvents can be highly toxic, and can sometimes be absorbed directly through the skin, or through inhaled vapors. Many solvents are also extremely flammable. The various solvents can also have an effect on the specific color of the dye solution, the lifetime of the singlet state, either enhancing or quenching the triplet state, and, thus, on the lasing bandwidth and power obtainable with a particular laser-pumping source.

Adamantane is added to some dyes to prolong their life.

Cycloheptatriene and cyclooctatetraene (COT) can be added as triplet quenchers for rhodamine G, increasing the laser output power. Output power of 1.4 kilowatt at 585 nm was achieved using Rhodamine 6G with COT in methanol-water solution.

== Excitation lasers ==
Flashlamps and several types of lasers can be used to optically pump dye lasers. A partial list of excitation lasers include:

- Copper vapor lasers
- Diode lasers
- Excimer lasers
- Nd:YAG lasers (mainly second and third harmonics)
- Nitrogen lasers
- Ruby lasers
- Argon ion lasers in the CW regime
- Krypton ion lasers in the CW regime

== Ultra-short optical pulses ==
R. L. Fork, B. I. Greene, and C. V. Shank demonstrated, in 1981, the generation of ultra-short laser pulse using a ring-dye laser (or dye laser exploiting colliding pulse mode-locking). This kind of laser is capable of generating laser pulses of ~ 0.1 ps duration.

The introduction of grating techniques and intra-cavity prismatic pulse compressors eventually resulted in the routine emission of femtosecond dye laser pulses.

== Applications ==
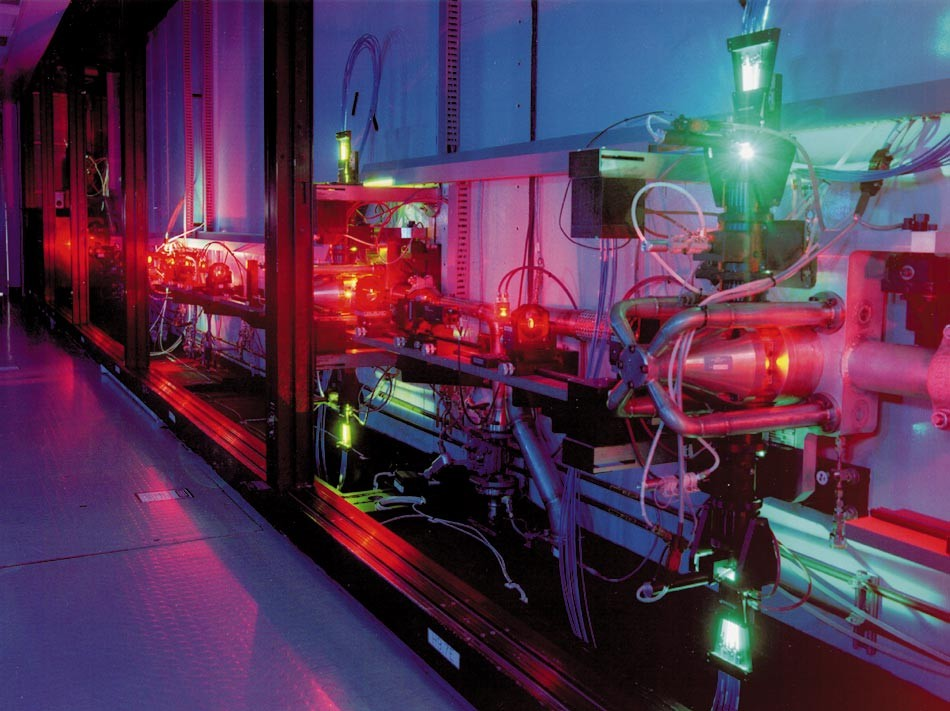
An atomic vapor laser isotope separation experiment at LLNL. Green light is from a copper vapor pump laser used to pump a highly tuned dye laser which is producing the orange light.

Dye lasers are very versatile. In addition to their recognized wavelength agility these lasers can offer very large pulsed energies or very high average powers. Flashlamp-pumped dye lasers have been shown to yield hundreds of Joules per pulse and copper-laser-pumped dye lasers are known to yield average powers in the kilowatt regime.

Dye lasers are used in many applications including:

- astronomy (as laser guide stars),
- atomic vapor laser isotope separation
- manufacturing
- medicine
- spectroscopy

In laser medicine these lasers are applied in several areas, including dermatology where they are used to make skin tone more even. The wide range of wavelengths possible allows very close matching to the absorption lines of certain tissues, such as melanin or hemoglobin, while the narrow bandwidth obtainable helps reduce the possibility of damage to the surrounding tissue. They are used to treat port-wine stains and other blood vessel disorders, scars and kidney stones. They can be matched to a variety of inks for tattoo removal, as well as a number of other applications.

In spectroscopy, dye lasers can be used to study the absorption and emission spectra of various materials. Their tunability, (from the near-infrared to the near-ultraviolet), narrow bandwidth, and high intensity allows a much greater diversity than other light sources. The variety of pulse widths, from ultra-short, femtosecond pulses to continuous-wave operation, makes them suitable for a wide range of applications, from the study of fluorescent lifetimes and semiconductor properties to lunar laser ranging experiments.

Tunable lasers are used in swept-frequency metrology to enable measurement of absolute distances with very high accuracy. A two-axis interferometer is set up and by sweeping the frequency, the frequency of the light returning from the fixed arm is slightly different from the frequency returning from the distance measuring arm. This produces a beat frequency which can be detected and used to determine the absolute difference between the lengths of the two arms.

== See also ==
- Laser dye – Dye used as a laser medium
- Organic laser – Laser that uses a carbon-based material as the gain medium
- Solid-state dye laser – Laser with a dye-doped organic matrix
- Tunable laser – Laser with a variable wavelength
