= Solid-state dye laser =

Laser with a dye-doped organic matrix

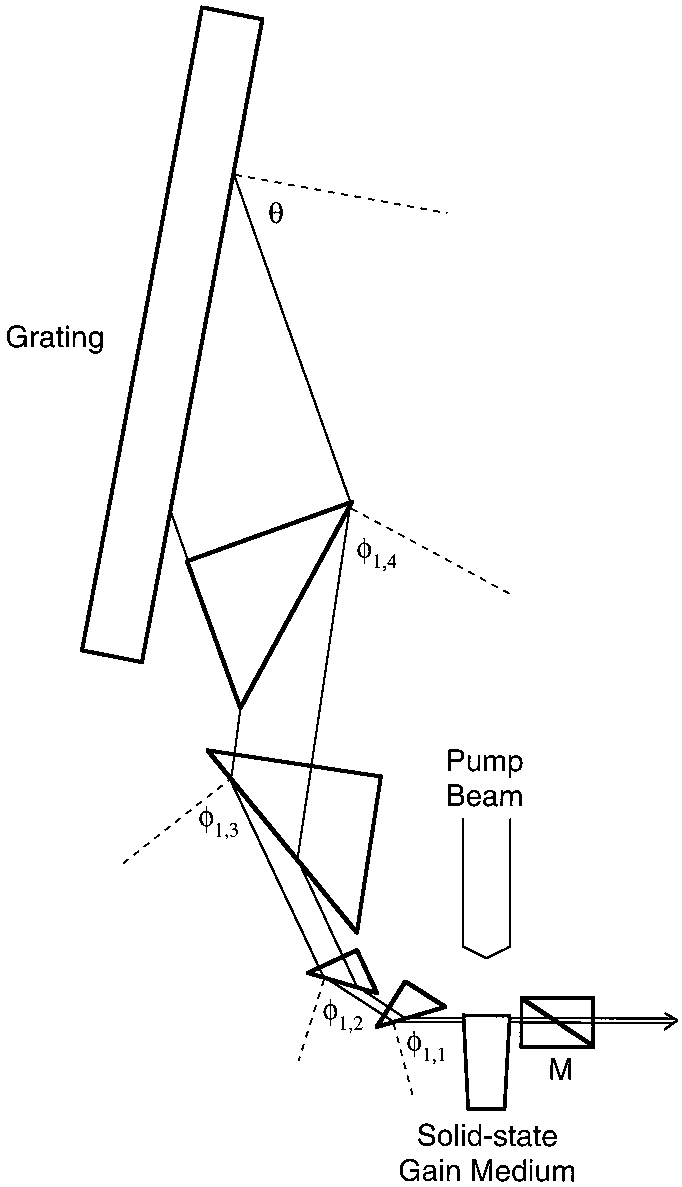
Organic solid-state narrow-linewidth tunable dye laser oscillator

A solid-state dye laser (SSDL) is a solid-state lasers in which the gain medium is a laser dye-doped organic matrix such as poly(methyl methacrylate) (PMMA), rather than a liquid solution of the dye. These lasers are also referred to as solid-state organic lasers and solid-state dye-doped polymer lasers.

SSDLs were introduced in 1967 by Soffer and McFarland.

== Organic gain media ==
In the 1990s, new forms of improved PMMA, such as modified PMMA, with high optical quality characteristics were introduced. Gain media research for SSDL has been rather active in the 21st century, and various new dye-doped solid-state organic matrices have been discovered. Notable among these new gain media are organic-inorganic dye-doped polymer-nanoparticle composites. An additional form of organic-inorganic dye-doped solid-state laser gain media are the ORMOSILs.

== High performance solid-state dye laser oscillators ==
This improved gain medium was central to the demonstration of the first tunable narrow-linewidth solid-state dye laser oscillators, by Duarte, which were later optimized to deliver pulse emission in the kW regime in nearly diffraction limited beams with single-longitudinal-mode laser linewidths of $\Delta \nu$ ≈ 350 MHz (or $\Delta \lambda$ ≈ 0.0004 nm, at a laser wavelength of 590 nm). These tunable laser oscillators use multiple-prism grating architectures yielding very high intracavity dispersions that can be nicely quantified using the multiple-prism grating equations.

== Distributed feedback and waveguide solid-state dye lasers ==
Additional developments in solid-state dye lasers were demonstrated with the introduction of distributed feedback laser designs in 1999 and distributed feedback waveguides in 2002.

== See also ==
- Laser linewidth
- Organic laser
- Organic photonics
- Tunable laser
- Multiple-prism grating laser oscillator
