= Rhodamine 6G =

- Rhodamine 6G (hydrochloride)

Names
- Preferred IUPAC name 9-[2-(Ethoxycarbonyl)phenyl]-N-ethyl-6-(ethylamino)-2,7-dimethyl-3H-xanthen-3-iminium chloride
- Other names Rhodamine 590, R6G, Rh6G, C.I. Pigment Red 81, C.I. Pigment Red 169, Basic Rhodamine Yellow, C.I. 45160

Identifiers
CAS Number	989-38-8
ChEBI	CHEBI:52672
ChEMBL	ChEMBL402140; ChEMBL1185241 (base)
ChemSpider	16736263
DrugBank	DB03825
ECHA InfoCard	100.012.350
EC Number	213-584-9
KEGG	C11177
PubChem CID	65211
RTECS number	DH0175000
UNII	037VRW83CF
CompTox Dashboard (EPA)	DTXSID1021243
- InChI: InChI=1S/C28H30N2O3.ClH/c1-6-29-23-15-25-21(13-17(23)4)27(19-11-9-10-12-20(19)28(31)32-8-3)22-14-18(5)24(30-7-2)16-26(22)33-25;/h9-16,29H,6-8H2,1-5H3;1H/b30-24-; Key: VYXSBFYARXAAKO-BXMGYBSLSA-N

Properties
Chemical formula	C_{28}H_{31}N_{2}O_{3}Cl
Molar mass	479.02 g/mol
Appearance	dark reddish purple, brown or black crystalline solid
Density	1.26 g/cm^{3}
Solubility in water	20 g/L (25 °C)
Solubility in methanol	400 g/L

Hazards
- GHS labelling
Pictograms	(GHS05: Corrosive) (GHS06: Toxic) (GHS07: Exclamation mark) (GHS09: Environmental hazard)
Signal word	Warning
Hazard statements	H301, H302, H318, H410, H411
Precautionary statements	P264, P270, P273, P280, P301+P310, P301+P312, P305+P351+P338, P310, P321, P330, P391, P405, P501
Safety data sheet (SDS)	External MSDS
- Except where otherwise noted, data are given for materials in their standard state (at 25 °C [77 °F], 100 kPa). verify (what is ?) Infobox references

Rhodamine 6G /ˈroʊdəmiːn/ is a highly fluorescent rhodamine family dye. It is often used as a tracer dye within water to determine the rate and direction of flow and transport. Rhodamine dyes fluoresce and can thus be detected easily and inexpensively with instruments called fluorometers. Rhodamine dyes are used extensively in biotechnology applications such as fluorescence microscopy, flow cytometry, fluorescence correlation spectroscopy and ELISA.

== Forms ==
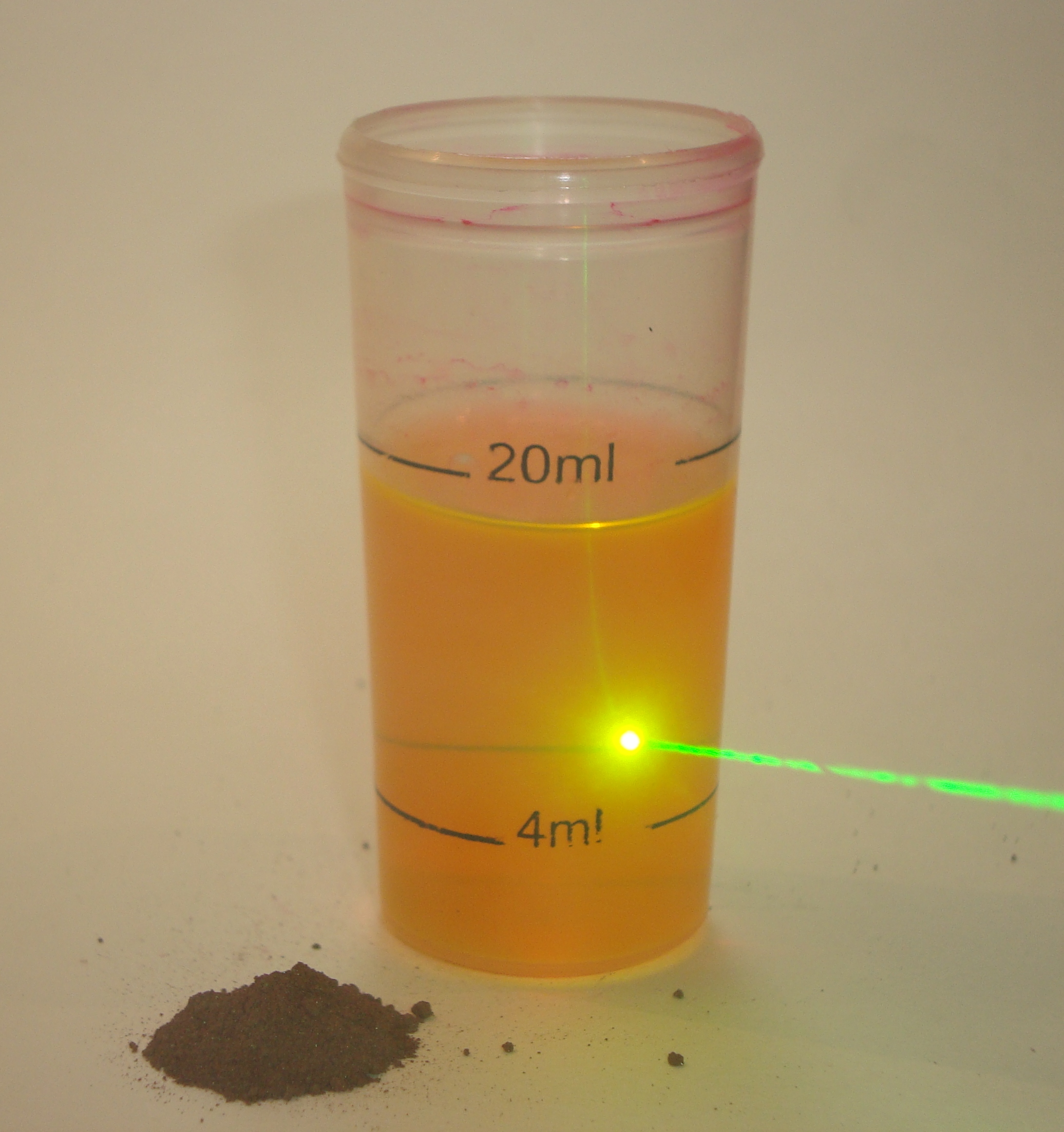
Rhodamine 6G chloride powder mixed with methanol, emitting yellow light under green laser illumination

Rhodamine 6G usually comes in three different forms. Rhodamine 6G chloride is a bronze/red powder with the chemical formula C_{28}H_{31}ClN_{2}O_{3}. Although highly soluble, this formulation is very corrosive to all metals except stainless steel. Other formulations are less soluble, but also less corrosive. Rhodamine 6G perchlorate (C_{28}H_{31}ClN_{2}O_{7}) comes in the form of red crystals, while rhodamine 6G tetrafluoroborate (C_{28}H_{31}BF_{4}N_{2}O_{3}) appears as maroon crystals.

== Solubility ==
Butanol (40 g/L), ethanol (80 g/L), methanol (400 g/L), propanol (15 g/L), MEG (50 g/L), DEG ( 100 g/L), TEG (100 g/L), isopropanol (15 g/L), ethoxyethanol (25 g/L), methoxyethanol (50 g/L), dipropylene glycol (30 g/L), PEG (20 g/L).

== Laser dye ==
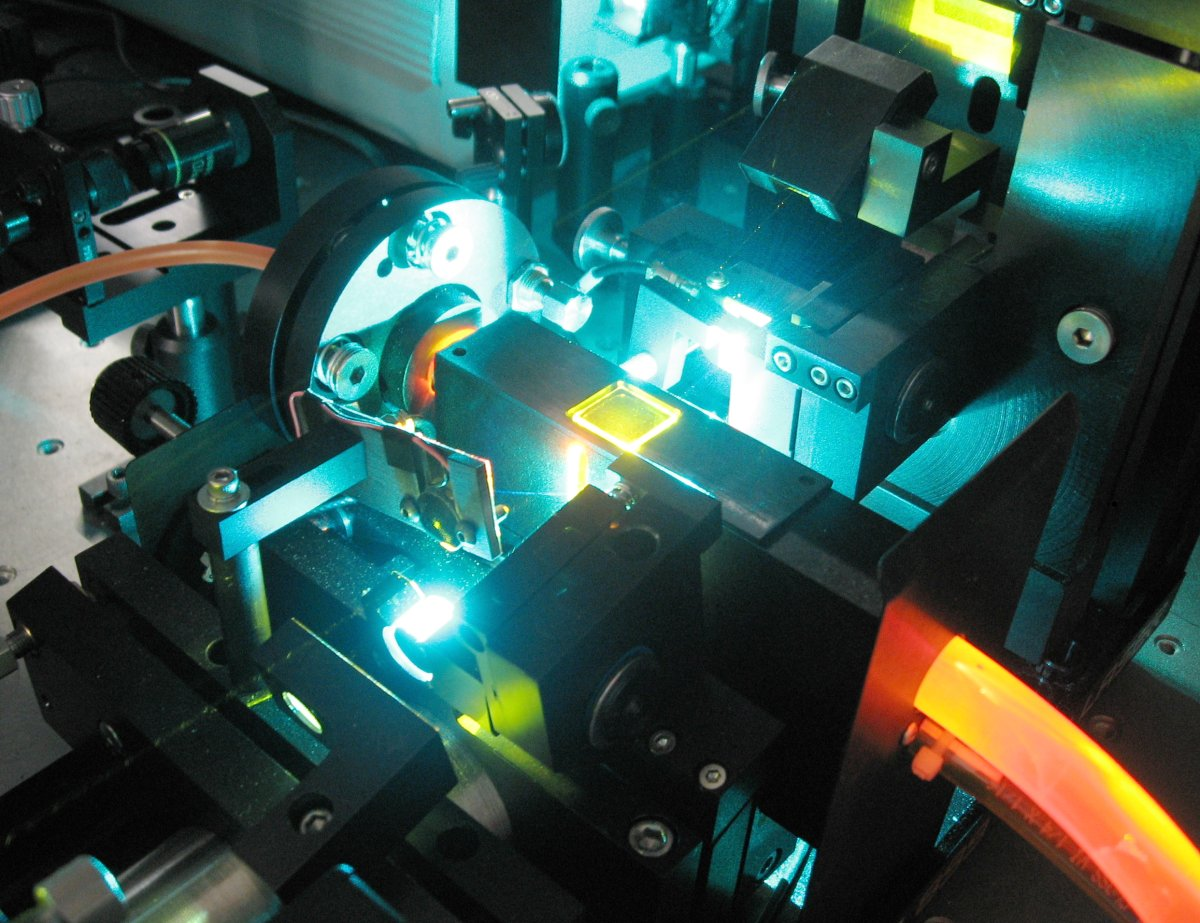
Rhodamine 6G-based dye laser. The dye solution is the orange fluid in the tubes.

Rhodamine 6G is also used as a laser dye, or gain medium, in dye lasers, and is pumped by the second (532 nm) harmonic from an Nd:YAG laser, nitrogen laser, or argon ion laser. The dye has a remarkably high photostability, high fluorescence quantum yield (0.95), low cost, and its lasing range has close proximity to its absorption maximum (approximately 530 nm). The lasing range of the dye is 570 to 660 nm with a maximum at 590 nm.

== Properties ==
The refractive index of Rhodamine 6G has been determined in recent studies. According to research published in ACS Applied Materials & Interfaces and the Refractive Index Database, the refractive index is 1.87 (k=0.79) for 532 nm wavelength.

== See also ==
- Rhodamine
- Rhodamine B
- Dye laser
- Laser dyes
