= Quantum yield =

Number of times a given event occurs per photon absorbed by a quantum system

In particle physics, the quantum yield (denoted Φ) of a radiation-induced process is the number of times a specific event occurs per photon absorbed by the system.

$$\Phi(\lambda)=\frac{\text {number of events}}{\text {number of photons absorbed}}$$

== Applications ==
=== Fluorescence spectroscopy ===
The fluorescence quantum yield (FQY) is defined as the ratio of the number of photons emitted to the number of photons absorbed.

$$\Phi = \frac{\text {number of photons emitted}}{\text {number of photons absorbed}}$$

Fluorescence quantum yield is measured on a scale from 0 to 1.0, but is often represented as a percentage. A quantum yield of 1.0 (100%) describes a process where each photon absorbed results in a photon emitted. Substances with the largest quantum yields, such as rhodamines, display the brightest emissions; however, compounds with quantum yields of 0.10 are still considered quite fluorescent.

Quantum yield is defined by the fraction of excited state fluorophores that decay through fluorescence:

$$\Phi_f = \frac{k_f}{k_f + \sum k_\mathrm{nr}}$$

where

- Φ_{f} is the fluorescence quantum yield,
- k_{f} is the rate constant for radiative relaxation (fluorescence),
- k_{nr} is the rate constant for all non-radiative relaxation processes.

Non-radiative processes are excited state decay mechanisms other than photon emission, which include: Förster resonance energy transfer, internal conversion, external conversion, and intersystem crossing. Thus, the fluorescence quantum yield is affected if the rate of any non-radiative pathway changes. The quantum yield can be close to unity if the non-radiative decay rate is much smaller than the rate of radiative decay, that is k_{f} > k_{nr}.

Fluorescence quantum yields are measured by comparison to a standard of known quantum yield. The quinine salt quinine sulfate in a sulfuric acid solution was regarded as the most common fluorescence standard, however, a recent study revealed that the fluorescence quantum yield of this solution is strongly affected by the temperature, and should no longer be used as the standard solution. The quinine in 0.1M perchloric acid (Φ = 0.60) shows no temperature dependence up to 45 °C, therefore it can be considered as a reliable standard solution.

Fluorescence quantum yield standards
Compound	Solvent	$\lambda_{\mathrm{ex}}(\mathrm{nm})$	$\Phi$
Quinine	0.1 M HClO_{4}	347.5	0.60 ± 0.02
Fluorescein	0.1 M NaOH	496	0.95 ± 0.03
Tryptophan	Water	280	0.13 ± 0.01
Rhodamine 6G	Ethanol	488	0.94

Experimentally, relative fluorescence quantum yields can be determined by measuring fluorescence of a fluorophore of known quantum yield with the same experimental parameters (excitation wavelength, slit widths, photomultiplier voltage etc.) as the substance in question. The quantum yield is then calculated by:

$$\Phi = \Phi_\mathrm{R} \times \frac{\mathit{Int}}{\mathit{Int}_\mathrm{R}} \times \frac{1-10^{-A_\mathrm{R}}}{1-10^{-A}} \times \frac{{n}^2}{{n_\mathrm{R}}^2}$$

where

- Φ is the quantum yield,
- Int is the area under the emission peak (on a wavelength scale),
- A is absorbance (also called "optical density") at the excitation wavelength,
- n is the refractive index of the solvent.

The subscript R denotes the respective values of the reference substance. The determination of fluorescence quantum yields in scattering media requires additional considerations and corrections.

==== FRET efficiency ====
Förster resonance energy transfer efficiency (E) is the quantum yield of the energy-transfer transition, i.e. the probability of the energy-transfer event occurring per donor excitation event:

$$E=\Phi_\mathrm{FRET}=\frac{k_\mathrm{ET}}{k_\mathrm{ET} + k_f + \sum k_\mathrm{nr}}$$

where

- k_{ET} is the rate of energy transfer,
- k_{f} the radiative decay rate (fluorescence) of the donor,
- k_{nr} are non-radiative relaxation rates (e.g., internal conversion, intersystem crossing, external conversion etc.).

==== Solvent and environmental effects ====
A fluorophore's environment can impact quantum yield, usually resulting from changes in the rates of non-radiative decay. Many fluorophores used to label macromolecules are sensitive to solvent polarity. The class of 8-anilinonaphthalene-1-sulfonic acid (ANS) probe molecules are essentially non-fluorescent when in aqueous solution, but become highly fluorescent in nonpolar solvents or when bound to proteins and membranes. The quantum yield of ANS is ~0.002 in aqueous buffer, but near 0.4 when bound to serum albumin.

=== Photochemical reactions ===
The quantum yield of a photochemical reaction describes the number of molecules undergoing a photochemical event per absorbed photon:

$$\Phi=\frac{\rm number\ of\ molecules\ undergoing\ reaction\ of\ interest}{\rm number\ of\ photons\ absorbed\ by\ photoreactive\ substance}$$

In a chemical photodegradation process, when a molecule dissociates after absorbing a light quantum, the quantum yield is the number of destroyed molecules divided by the number of photons absorbed by the system. Since not all photons are absorbed productively, the typical quantum yield will be less than 1.

$$\Phi = \frac{\rm number\ of\ molecules \ decomposed} {\rm number\ of\ photons \ absorbed}$$

Quantum yields greater than 1 are possible for photo-induced or radiation-induced chain reactions, in which a single photon may trigger a long chain of transformations. One example is the reaction of hydrogen with chlorine, in which as many as 10^{6} molecules of hydrogen chloride can be formed per quantum of blue light absorbed.

Quantum yields of photochemical reactions can be highly dependent on the structure, proximity and concentration of the reactive chromophores, the type of solvent environment as well as the wavelength of the incident light. Such effects can be studied with wavelength-tunable lasers and the resulting quantum yield data can help predict conversion and selectivity of photochemical reactions.

In optical spectroscopy, the quantum yield is the probability that a given quantum state is formed from the system initially prepared in some other quantum state. For example, a singlet to triplet transition quantum yield is the fraction of molecules that, after being photoexcited into a singlet state, cross over to the triplet state.

=== Photosynthesis ===
Quantum yield is used in modeling photosynthesis:

$$\Phi = \frac {\rm \mu mol\ CO_2 \ fixed} {\rm \mu mol\ photons \ absorbed}$$

== See also ==
- Quantum dot
- Quantum efficiency
- Molecular Cage
- Photoswitches
