= Stryer =

Stryer may refer to:

- Lubert Stryer (born 1938), doctor and biochemist
- Biochemistry, a textbook series first written by him
