= Aggresome =

Aggregation of misfolded proteins in cells

In eukaryotic cells, an aggresome refers to an aggregation of misfolded proteins in the cell, formed when the protein degradation system of the cell is overwhelmed. Aggresome formation is a highly regulated process that possibly serves to organize misfolded proteins into a single location.

== Biogenesis ==
Correct folding requires proteins to assume one particular structure from a constellation of possible but incorrect conformations. The failure of polypeptides to adopt their proper structure is a major threat to cell function and viability. Consequently, elaborate systems have evolved to protect cells from the deleterious effects of misfolded proteins.

Upon synthesis, proteins are in their linear and non-functional form, called a nascent protein. They must undergo co-translational folding as quickly as possible in order to become a functional, three-dimensional structure. Normally folded proteins are referred to as being in their native structure. In this state, they have undergone a hydrophobic collapse process, indicated by outward-facing hydrophilic components and inward-facing hydrophobic components.

The solubility of proteins is an important biochemical aspect of protein folding as it has been shown to affect the formation of protein aggregates. Contrary to native structures, a misfolded protein will often have outward-facing hydrophobic regions which acts as an attractant to other insoluble proteins. There are some chaperones which identify aggregates by recognizing their hydrophobic region. These chaperone may work as solubilizers.

Cells mainly deploy three mechanisms to counteract misfolded proteins: up-regulating chaperones to assist protein refolding, proteolytic degradation of the misfolded/damaged proteins involving ubiquitin–proteasome and autophagy–lysosome systems, and formation of detergent-insoluble aggresomes by transporting the misfolded proteins along microtubules to a region near the nucleus. Intracellular deposition of misfolded protein aggregates into ubiquitin-rich cytoplasmic inclusions is linked to the pathogenesis of many diseases. Functional blockade of either degradative system leads to an enhanced aggresome formation. Why these aggregates form despite the existence of cellular machinery to recognize and degrade misfolded protein, and how they are delivered to cytoplasmic inclusions, are not known.

Aggresome formation is accompanied by redistribution of the intermediate filament protein vimentin to form a cage surrounding a pericentriolar core of aggregated, ubiquitinated protein. Disruption of microtubules blocks the formation of aggresomes. Similarly, inhibition of proteasome function also prevents the degradation of unassembled presenilin-1 (PSE_{1}) molecules leading to their aggregation and deposition in aggresomes. Aggresome formation is a general response of cells which occurs when the capacity of the proteasome is exceeded by the production of aggregation-prone misfolded proteins.

Typically, an aggresome forms in response to a cellular stress which generates a large amount of misfolded or partially denatured protein: hyperthermia, overexpression of an insoluble or mutant protein, etc. The formation of the aggresome is largely believed to be a protective response, sequestering potentially cytotoxic aggregates and also acting as a staging center for eventual autophagic clearance from the cell.

An aggresome forms around the microtubule organizing center in eukaryotic cells, adjacent to or enveloping the cell's centrosomes. Polyubiquitination tags the protein for retrograde transport via HDAC6 binding and microtubule-based motor protein, dynein. Moreover, substrates can also be targeted to the aggresome by a ubiquitin-independent pathway mediated by the stress-induced co-chaperone BAG3 (Bcl-2-associated athanogene 3), which transfers misfolded protein substrates bound to HSP70 (heat-shock protein 70) directly on to the microtubule motor dynein. The protein aggregate is then transported along the microtubule and unloaded via ATPase p97 forming the aggresome. Mediators such as p62 are believed to be involved in aggresome formation in sequestering omega-somes, which bind and increase the size of the aggresome. The aggresome is eventually targeted for autophagic clearance from the cell. Some pathological proteins, such as alpha-synuclein, cannot be degraded and cause the aggresomes to form inclusion bodies (in Parkinson's disease, Lewy bodies) which contribute to neuronal dysfunction and death.

== Triggering aggresome formation ==
Abnormal polypeptides that escape proteasome-dependent degradation and aggregate in cytosol can be transported via microtubules to an aggresome, a recently discovered organelle where aggregated proteins are stored or degraded by autophagy. Synphilin 1, a protein implicated in Parkinson disease, was used as a model to study mechanisms of aggresome formation. When expressed in naïve HEK293 cells, synphilin 1 forms multiple small highly mobile aggregates. However, proteasome or Hsp90 inhibition rapidly triggered their translocation into the aggresome, and surprisingly, this response was independent on the expression level of synphilin 1. Therefore, aggresome formation, but not aggregation of synphilin 1, represents a special cellular response to a failure of the proteasome/chaperone machinery. Importantly, translocation to aggresomes required a special aggresome-targeting signal within the sequence of synphilin 1, an ankyrin-like repeat domain. On the other hand, formation of multiple small aggregates required an entirely different segment within synphilin 1, indicating that aggregation and aggresome formation determinants can be separated genetically. Furthermore, substitution of the ankyrin-like repeat in synphilin 1 with an aggresome-targeting signal from huntingtin was sufficient for aggresome formation upon inhibition of the proteasome. Analogously, attachment of the ankyrin-like repeat to a huntingtin fragment lacking its aggresome-targeting signal promoted its transport to aggresomes. These findings indicate the existence of transferable signals that target aggregation-prone polypeptides to aggresomes.

== Human disease ==
Accumulation of misfolded proteins in proteinaceous inclusions is common to many age-related neurodegenerative diseases, including Parkinson's disease, Alzheimer's disease, Huntington's disease, and amyotrophic lateral sclerosis. In cultured cells, when the production of misfolded proteins exceeds the capacity of the chaperone refolding system and the ubiquitin-proteasome degradation pathway, misfolded proteins are actively transported to a cytoplasmic juxtanuclear structure called an aggresome. Whether aggresomes are benevolent or noxious is unknown, but they are of particular interest because of the appearance of similar inclusions in protein deposition diseases. Evidence shows that aggresomes serve a cytoprotective function and are associated with accelerated turnover of mutant proteins. Experiments show that mutant androgen receptor (AR), the protein responsible for X-linked spinobulbar muscular atrophy, forms insoluble aggregates and is toxic to cultured cells. Mutant AR was also found to form aggresomes in a process distinct from aggregation. Molecular and pharmacological interventions were used to disrupt aggresome formation, revealing their cytoprotective function. Aggresome-forming proteins were found to have an accelerated rate of turnover, and this turnover was slowed by inhibition of aggresome formation. Finally, it is shown that aggresome-forming proteins become membrane-bound and associate with lysosomal structures. Together, these findings suggest that aggresomes are cytoprotective, serving as cytoplasmic recruitment centers to facilitate degradation of toxic proteins.

=== Proteins implicated in aggresome formation ===
Histone deacetylase 6 is the protein that, in the deacetylase adaptor protein function, forms Lewy bodies (the regular wild-type protein localized to inclusion bodies). No mutation associated with disease has been linked to this protein.

Parkin is the protein that, in the protein ligase function, forms Lewy bodies (the regular wild-type protein localized to inclusion bodies). Parkinson's disease has been linked to this protein when there is a protein.

Ataxin-3 is the protein that, in the deubiquitinating enzyme function, forms SCA type-1 and 2 DRPLA intranuclear inclusions (the regular wild-type protein localized to inclusion bodies). SCA type-3 has been linked to this protein when there is a protein.

Dynein motor complex is the protein that, in the retrograde microtubule motor function, forms an unknown protein (the regular wild-type protein localized to inclusion bodies). Motor neuron degeneration has been linked to this protein when there is a protein.

Ubiquilin-1 is the protein that, in the protein turnover, intracellular trafficking function, forms Lewy bodies and neurofibrillary tangles (the regular wild-type protein localized to inclusion bodies). Alzheimer's disease (potential risk factor) has been linked to this protein when there is a protein.

=== Cystic fibrosis ===
Cystic fibrosis transmembrane conductance regulator (CFTR) is an inefficiently folded integral membrane protein that is degraded by the cytoplasmic ubiquitin-proteasome pathway. Overexpression or inhibition of proteasome activity in transfected human embryonic kidney cells or Chinese hamster ovary cells leads to the accumulation of stable, high molecular weight, detergent-insoluble, multi-ubiquitinated forms of CFTR. Undergraded CFTR molecules accumulate at a distinct pericentriolar aggresome.

== Role of the aggresome pathway in cancer ==
There is emerging evidence that inhibiting the aggresome pathway leads to accumulation of misfolded proteins and apoptosis in tumor cells through autophagy.

== See also ==
- JUNQ and IPOD
