= Alexa Fluor =

Family of fluorescent dyes

The Alexa Fluor family of fluorescent dyes is a series of dyes invented by Molecular Probes, now a part of Thermo Fisher Scientific, and sold under the Invitrogen brand name. Alexa Fluor dyes are frequently used as cell and tissue labels in fluorescence microscopy and cell biology. Alexa Fluor dyes can be conjugated directly to primary antibodies or to secondary antibodies to amplify signal and sensitivity or other biomolecules.

The excitation and emission spectra of the Alexa Fluor series cover the visible spectrum and extend into the infrared. The individual members of the family are numbered according roughly to their excitation maxima in nanometers.

== History ==
Richard and Rosaria Haugland, the founders of Molecular Probes, are well known in biology and chemistry for their research into fluorescent dyes useful in biological research applications. At the time that Molecular Probes was founded, such products were largely unavailable commercially. A number of fluorescent dyes that are now widely used were discovered and developed in the laboratories of Molecular Probes.—dyes such as Texas Red, Cascade Blue, Oregon Green, Marina Blue, and the Alexa Fluor family. The most famous of these, the Alexa Fluor family of dyes, were designed to improve upon properties of previously developed biological fluorescent dye families, and solve some of the issues that they possessed. The Alexa Fluor dyes were named after Alex Haugland, son of Richard and Rosaria Haugland.

Molecular Probes was acquired in 2003 by Invitrogen, who worked to further expand the Alexa Fluor family by the addition of new dyes to fill gaps not covered in the emission spectrum. In 2008, Invitrogen and the Alexa Fluor product line became a part of the Life Technologies, after the Invitrogen merger with Applied Biosystems. In 2014, Life Technologies was acquired by Thermo Fisher Scientific, who revitalized the Invitrogen name and brand, bringing the Alexa Fluor product line back under it.

== Dyes and chemistry ==
The Alexa Fluor dyes were chemically synthesized through sulfonation and additional chemical modifications made to the well known families of coumarin, rhodamine, and cyanine dyes, and to the xanthene family (of which the fluorescein, an industry-standard, is a part). Sulfonation made the product Alexa Fluor dyes negatively charged and thus more hydrophilic and soluble than their parent dyes; the additional modifications were aimed to improve dye performance in other areas. For example, Alexa Fluor 488, a sulfonated and otherwise chemically modified form of fluorescein, was designed to solve the well known issues of rapid photobleaching and pH-dependent fluorescent intensity characteristic of the dye fluorescein isothiocyanate.

	Colour^{†}	Absorb (nm)	Emit (nm)	MM (g/mol)	ε (cm^{−1}M^{−1})	Quantum yield
Alexa Fluor 350	Blue	346	442	410	19,000	-
— 405	Blue	401	421	1028	35,000	-
— 430	Green	434	541	702	15,000	-
— 488	Green	495	519	643	73,000	0.92
— 500	Green	502	525	700	71,000	-
— 514	Green	517	542	714	80,000	-
— 532	Yellow	532	554	721	81,000	0.61
— 546	Yellow	556	573	1079	112,000	0.79
— 555	Orange	555	565	~1250	155,000	0.1
— 568	Orange	578	603	792	88,000	0.69
— 594	Red	590	617	820	92,000	0.66
— 610	Red	612	628	1172	144,000	-
— 633	Far-red	632	647	~1200	159,000	-
— 635	Far-red	633	647	-	140,000	-
— 647	Far-red	650	665	1155.06	270,000	0.33
— 660	Near-IR	663	690	~1100	132,000	0.37
— 680	Near-IR	679	702	~1150	183,000	0.36
— 700	Near-IR	702	723	~1400	205,000	0.25
— 750	Near-IR	749	775	~1300	290,000	0.12
— 790	Near-IR	782	805	~1750	260,000	-
† = approximate colour of the emission spectrum ε = extinction coefficient

== Comparison with other dyes ==
The Alexa Fluor series dyes are less pH-sensitive and more photostable than the original dyes (fluorescein, rhodamine, etc.) from which they were synthesized. While extinction coefficients of each member of this line of dyes are known (see table), quantum yields and life times are not. Brightness comparisons are also generally favorable.

Other commercial product lines provide alternatives to individual members of the line of Alexa Fluor Dyes. Comparisons with other dyes are less consistent, and also even more "delicate", depending on the conditions and techniques used. Such comparisons should be considered, depending on the conditions and techniques used, and the dye performance (signal, background, stability) needed.

=== Specific comparison studies ===
- Alexa Fluor 647 dye compared to dye Cy5, in an application involving conjugation to DNA.
