= Long-range restriction mapping =

Long-range restriction mapping is an alternative genomic mapping technique to short-range, also called fine-scale mapping. Both forms utilize restriction enzymes in order to decipher the previously unknown order of DNA segments; the main difference between the two being the amount of DNA that comprises the final map. The unknown DNA is broken into many smaller fragments by these restriction enzymes at specific sites on the molecule, and then the fragments can later be analyzed by their individual sizes. A final long-range map can span hundreds to thousands of kilobytes of genetic data at many different loci.

The long-range maps cover very large genomics regions in order to display the physical relationship of DNA segments targeted by restriction enzymes. These restriction sites are an integral component to the formation of long-range mapping. Genetic linkage data can be combined with gel electrophoresis procedures to provide gene order as well as distance on chromosomes. To accomplish this, the genetic linkage information is used to create a theory-based hypothesis: one that can be tested with gel electrophoresis and extended DNA sequencing protocols.

== Construction ==
The formation of a long-range restriction map is similar to a short-range map, but there is an increase in experimental complexity as the size of the genomic section increases. To begin this process, magnification of DNA quantity has to occur. Endonuclease-mediated long polymerase chain reactions allow for DNA fragments of up to 40 kb to be amplified. In some practices, two equivalents of DNA are restricted at one site, and a third equivalent is restricted in both of the sites. With enough purified plasmid DNA and digestive enzymes, the Pulsed-field gel electrophoresis (PFGE) process can begin: alternating voltages are combined with a standard gel electrophoresis that results in a much longer procedure. To run this gel effectively, the DNA of interest must be combined with specific rare-cutting restriction endonuclease. After running the gel and imaging it, usually in UV light, the size of the DNA fragments can be determined. So far this process is very similar to the short-range mapping technique.

After Pulsed-field gel electrophoresis, a southern blotting technique is performed and detections of specific fragments using molecular probes occur to complete the production of large-scale restriction maps. The map is created via an elaborate and deductive process of interpreting data. From the PFGE and the southern blotting, an experimenter must analyze the molecular probes in order to find a descending number of similarities in a ranking of these fragments.

In some novel experiments the type of gel electrophoresis has been adapted to try and increase the resolution of genetic information. Capillary electrophoresis has been used in conjunction with laser-induced fluorescence detection to elevate the process of restriction mapping. This type of electrophoresis focuses on the specific charges of ions and their movement in an electrophoretic field instead of whole DNA fragments. The fluorescence of these atoms allows for visualization of atomic movement; essentially the process zooms in on the field of view of a standard gel electrophoresis.

== Applications ==
These types of restriction maps can provide insight into the identification of genes in many disorders, eventually increasing the possibility of successful therapies. Duchenne muscular dystrophy, cystic fibrosis, and retinitis pigmentosa are a few of many genetic diseases that have benefited from the information restriction mapping has provided. The biochemical origins of these diseases, along with the majority of other genetic diseases, are unknown and this can hinder the progress of preventative or even symptomatic treatment. Knowing that mutation is the source of novel genetic variation, being able to connect the physical distance of these nucleotide changes with disease-linked structural novelties is the most pertinent application of long-range restriction mapping.

Even the study of illnesses that are not congenital have benefitted from long-range restriction mapping, specifically HPV-, HIV-, and certain hormone connected brain tumors. The organization that restriction mapping provides allows for novel experiments to draw connections between genetic disparities and life-afflicting diseases. Restriction mapping can often be cheaper than full genetic sequencing, allowing labs to visually represent aspects of the genome they might not otherwise have access to. Advancements in computer programming has allowed some automated software to produce potential restriction maps, forming another path to visualization when experimental costs get too high.

== See also ==
- Pulsed-field gel electrophoresis, detailed methodology on this specific version of gel electrophoresis
