= Texas Red (disambiguation) =

Texas Red is a red fluorescent dye.

Texas Red may also refer to:

- The 1976 LP by Red Steagall, or the title song
- Texas Red (horse) (born 2012), American Thoroughbred racehorse
- Red Bastien (1931–2012), professional wrestler who formerly used the ring name Texas Red
- Gene Petit (1949–2013), professional wrestler who formerly used the ring name Texas Red
- The Undertaker (born 1965), professional wrestler who formerly used the ring name Texas Red
- Texas Red, a character in the country ballad Big Iron
