= Sulforhodamine 101 =

Red fluorescent dye

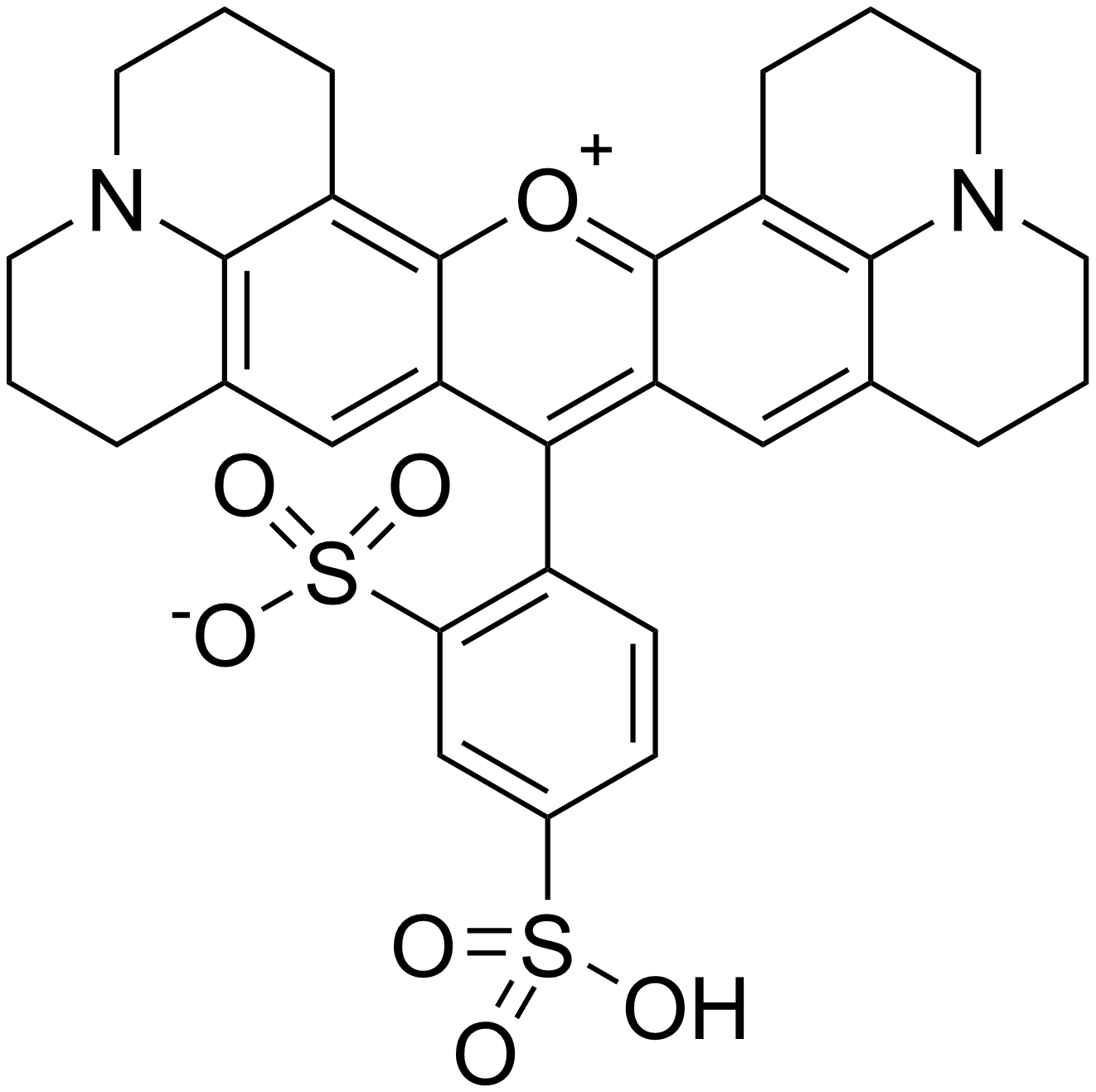

Identifiers
CAS Number	60311-02-6
3D model (JSmol)	Interactive image
Beilstein Reference	3582548
ChemSpider	108971
ECHA InfoCard	100.056.491
EC Number	262-159-4
PubChem CID	122180
UNII	FX0ES3271V
CompTox Dashboard (EPA)	DTXSID00922157
- InChI: InChI=1S/C31H30N2O7S2/c34-41(35,36)20-9-10-21(26(17-20)42(37,38)39)27-24-15-18-5-1-11-32-13-3-7-22(28(18)32)30(24)40-31-23-8-4-14-33-12-2-6-19(29(23)33)16-25(27)31/h9-10,15-17H,1-8,11-14H2,(H-,34,35,36,37,38,39) Key: COIVODZMVVUETJ-UHFFFAOYSA-N
- SMILES: [O-]S(C(C=C(S(O)(=O)=O)C=C1)=C1C2=C(C=C3C4=C5CCCN4CCC3)C5=[O+]C6=C(CCCN7CCC8)C7=C8C=C62)(=O)=O

Properties
Chemical formula	C_{31}H_{30}N_{2}O_{7}S_{2}
Molar mass	606.71 g·mol^{−1}

Hazards
- GHS labelling
Pictograms	(GHS07: Exclamation mark)
Signal word	Warning
Hazard statements	H315, H319, H335, H412
Precautionary statements	P261, P264, P264+P265, P271, P273, P280, P302+P352, P304+P340, P305+P351+P338, P319, P321, P332+P317, P337+P317, P362+P364, P403+P233, P405, P501
- Except where otherwise noted, data are given for materials in their standard state (at 25 °C [77 °F], 100 kPa). verify (what is ?) Infobox references

Sulforhodamine 101 (SR101) is a red fluorescent dye. In neurophysiological experiments which comprise calcium imaging methods, it can be used for a counterstaining of astrocytes to be able to analyze data from neurons separately. However, in addition to labeling astrocytes, SR101 labels myelinating oligodendrocytes. SR101 has been reported to affect excitability of neurons and should therefore be used with caution.

A sulfonyl chloride derivative of sulforhodamine 101, known as Texas Red, is used for conjugation to a number of functional groups, especially primary amines.
