= Protein aggregation predictors =

Computational methods that use protein sequence and/ or protein structure to predict protein aggregation. The table below, shows the main features of software for prediction of protein aggregation

== Table ==
Table 1
Method	Last Update	Access (Web server/downloadable)	Principle	Input		Output
Method	Last Update	Access (Web server/downloadable)	Principle	Sequence / 3D Structure	Additional parameters	Output
Amyloidogenic Patten	2004	Web Server- AMYLPRED2	Secondary structure-related Amyloidogenic pattern Submissions are scanned for the existence of this pattern {P}-{PKRHW}-[VLSCWFNQE]-[ILTYWFNE]-[FIY]-{PKRH} at identity level, with the use of a simple custom script.	sequence	-	Amyloidogenic regions
Tango	2004	Web Server-TANGO	Phenomenological Based on physico-chemical principles of secondary structure formation extended by the assumption that the core regions of an aggregate are fully buried.	sequence	pH/ionic strength	Overall aggregation and amyloidoidogenic regions
Average Packing Density	2006	Web Server-AMYLPRED2	Secondary structure-related Relates average packing density of residues to the formation of amyloid fibrils.	sequence	-	Amyloidogenic regions
Beta-strand contiguity	2007	Web Server- AMYLPRED2	Phenomenological Prediction of B-strand propensity score to locate in the amyloid fibril.	sequence	-	beta-strand formation
Hexapeptide Conformational Energy /Pre-amyl	2007	Web Server- AMYLPRED2	Secondary structure-related Hexapeptides of a submitted protein are threaded onto over 2500 templates of microcrystallic structure of NNQQNY, energy values below -27.00 are considered as hits.	sequence	-	Amyloidogenic regions and energy
AGGRESCAN	2007	Web Servers -AMLYPRED2 & AGGRESCAN	Phenomenological Prediction of 'aggregation-prone' in protein sequences, based on an aggregation propensity scale for natural amino acids derived from in vivo experiments.	sequence	-	Overall aggregation and amyloidogenic regions
Salsa	2007	Web server - AMYPdb	Phenomenological Prediction of the aggregation propensities single or multiple sequences based on physicochemical properties.	sequence	hot spot length	Amyloidogenic regions
Pafig	2009	Web server- AMYLPRED2 Download	Phenomenological Identification of Hexapeptides associated to amyloid fibrillar aggregates.	sequence	-	Amyloidogenic regions
Net-CSSP	2020	Web Server - Net-CSSP AMYLPRED2	Secondary structure-related Quantification of the influence of the tertiary interation on secondary structural preference.	sequence/pdb	single/dual network-threshold	Amyloidogenic propensity regions
Betascan	2009	Web Server - Betascan Download - Betascan	Secondary structure-related Predict the probability that particular portions of a protein will form amyloid.	sequence	length	Amyloidogenic regions
FoldAmyloid	2010	Web Server - FoldAmyloid	Secondary structure-related Prediction of amyloid regions using expected probability of hydrogen bonds formation and packing densitites of residues.	sequence	scale, threshold, averaging frame	Amyloidogenic regions
Waltz	2010	Web Server - Waltz & AMYLPRED2	Secondary structure-related Application of position-specific substitution matrices (PSSM) obtained from amyloidogenic peptides.	sequence	pH, specificity, sensitivity	Amyloidogenic regions
Zipper DB	2010	Web Server- Zipper DB	Secondary structure-related Structure based prediction of fribrillation propoensities, using crystal strucutrue of the fibril forming peptide NNQQNY from the sup 35 prion protein of Saccharomyces cerevisiae.	sequence	-	Amyloidogenic regions and, energy and beta-sheet conformation
STITCHER	2012	Web Server - Stitcher (currently offline)	Secondary structure-related	sequence	-	Amyloidogenic regions
MetAmyl	2013	Web Server - MetAmyl	Consensus method Amyloidogenic patterns, average packing density, beta-strand contiguity, pafig, Net-CSSP, STITCHER	sequence	threshold	Overall generic and amyloidogenic regions based on the consensus
AmylPred2	2013	Web Server - AMYLPRED2	Consensus method Amyloidogenic patterns, average packing density, beta-strand contiguity, pafig, Net-CSSP, STITCHER	sequence	-	Overall generic and amyloidogenic regions based on the consensus
PASTA 2.0	2014	Web Server - PASTA 2.0	Secondary structure-related Predicts the most aggregation-prone portions and the corresponding β-strand inter-molecular pairing for multiple input sequences.	sequence	top pairings and energies, mutations and protein-protein	Amyloidogenic regions, energy, and beta-sheet orientation in aggregates
FISH Amyloid	2014	Web Server - Comprec (currently offline)	Secondary structure-related	sequence	threshold	Amyloidogenic regions
GAP	2014	Web Server - GAP	Secondary structure-related Identification of amyloid forming peptides and amorphous peptides using a dataset of 139 amyloids and 168 amorphous peptides.	sequence	-	Overall aggregation and amyloidogenic regions
APPNN	2015	Download - CRAN	Phenomenological Amyloidogenicity propensity predictor based on a machine learning approach through recursive feature selection and feed-forward neural networks, taking advantage of newly published sequences with experimental, in vitro, evidence of amyloid formation.	sequence	-	Amyloidogenic regions
ArchCandy	2015	Download- BiSMM	Secondary structure-related Based on an assumption that protein sequences that are able to form β-arcades are amyloidogenic.	sequence	-	Amyloidogenic regions
Amyload	2015	Web Server - Comprec (currently offline)	Consensus method	sequence	-	Overall generic and amyloidogenic regions
SolubiS	2016	Web Server - SolubiS	3D structure	pdb file	chain, threshold, gatekeeper	Aggregation propensity and stability vs mutations
CamSol Structurally Corrected	2017	Web Server - Chemistry of Health	3D structure	pdb file	pH, patch radius	Exposed aggregation-prone patches and mutated variants design
CamSol intrinsic	2017	Web Server- Chemistry of Health	Phenomenological Sequence-based method of predicting protein solubility and generic aggregation propensity.	sequence	pH	Calculation of the overall intrinsic solubility score and solubility profile
AmyloGram	2017	Web Server - AmyloGram	Phenomenological AmyloGram predicts amyloid proteins using n-gram encoding and random forests.	sequence	-	Overall aggregation and amyloidogenic regions
BetaSerpentine	2017	Web Server - BetaSerpentine-1.0	Sequence-related Reconstruction of amyloid structures containing adjacent β-arches.	sequence	-	Amyloidogenic regions
AggScore	2018	AggScore is available through Schrödinger's BioLuminate Suite as of software release 2018-1.	Secondary structure-related Method that uses the distribution of hydrophobic and electrostatic patches on the surface of the protein, factoring in the intensity and relative orientation of the respective surface patches into an aggregation propensity function that has been trained on a benchmark set of 31 adnectin proteins.	sequence	-	Amyloidogenic regions
AggreRATE-Pred	2018	Web Server - AggreRAE-Pred	Secondary structure-related Predict changes in aggregation rate upon point mutations	sequence pdb	mutations	
AGGRESCAN 3D 2.0	2019	Web Server - Aggrescan3D	3D structure	pdb file	dynamic mode, mutations, patch radius, stability, enhance solubility	Dynamic exposed aggregation-prone patches and mutated variants design
Budapest amyloid predictor	2021	Web Server - Budapest amyloid predictor	Hexapeptide	sequence		Amyloidgenecity of hexapeptide
ANuPP	2021	Web Server - ANuPP	Hexapeptide and Sequence Identification amyloid-fibril forming peptides and regions in protein sequences	sequence		Amyloidogenic hexapeptides and aggregation prone regions
Cordax	2020	Web Server - Cordax	Hexapeptide and sequence predicion of amyloid propensity based on sequence and machine-learning approaches, amyloid template structure and FoldX force field.	seqence		Amyloidogenic regions, structural model (PDB)
Kamal	2012	Download from EMBRAPA website	Sequence - can use varying prediction models and varying sequence length. Based on prediction of membrane-disrupting properties.	sequence; can use whole proteome in FASTA format	Proposed use can be demonstrated in whole human proteome search	Aggregation prediction

== See also ==
PhasAGE toolbox

Amyloid

Protein aggregation
