= Lubert Stryer =

American biochemist (1938–2024)

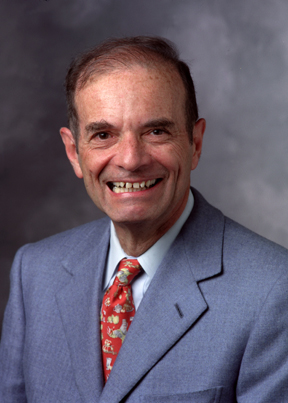
- Born: March 2, 1938; Tianjin, China
- Died: April 8, 2024 (aged 86); Stanford, California, U.S.
- Citizenship: United States
- Education: University of Chicago (B.S. 1957); Harvard Medical School (M.D.)
- Known for: Textbook Biochemistry (ten editions)
- Awards: European Inventor of the Year (2006), Eli Lilly Award in Biological Chemistry
- Scientific career
- Fields: Biochemistry, fluorescence spectroscopy
- Institutions: Department of physics at Harvard; MRC Laboratory of Molecular Biology at Cambridge, UK; department of biochemistry at Stanford University; Yale University
- Notable students: Richard P. Haugland, Jeremy M. Berg

Lubert Stryer (March 2, 1938 – April 8, 2024) was an American academic who was the Emeritus Mrs. George A. Winzer Professor of Cell Biology, at Stanford University School of Medicine. His research over more than four decades had been centered on the interplay of light and life. In 2006 he received the National Medal of Science from President Bush at a ceremony at the White House for elucidating the biochemical basis of signal amplification in vision, pioneering the development of high density microarrays for genetic analysis, and authoring the standard undergraduate biochemistry textbook, Biochemistry. It is now in its tenth edition and also edited by Jeremy Berg, Justin Hines, John L. Tymoczko and Gregory J. Gatto, Jr.

Stryer received his B.S. degree from the University of Chicago in 1957 and his M.D. degree from Harvard Medical School. He was a Helen Hay Whitney Research Fellow in the department of physics at Harvard and then at the MRC Laboratory of Molecular Biology in Cambridge, England, before joining the faculty of the department of biochemistry at Stanford in 1963. In 1969 he moved to Yale to become Professor of Molecular Biophysics and Biochemistry, and in 1976, he returned to Stanford to head a new Department of Structural Biology.

Stryer died in Stanford, California April 8, 2024, at the age of 86.

== Research profile ==
Stryer and coworkers pioneered the use of fluorescence spectroscopy, particularly Förster resonance energy transfer (FRET), to monitor the structure and dynamics of biological macromolecules. In 1967, Stryer and Haugland showed that the efficiency of energy transfer depends on the inverse sixth power of the distance between the donor and acceptor, as predicted by Förster's theory. They proposed that energy transfer can serve as a spectroscopic ruler to reveal proximity relationships in biological macromolecules.

A second contribution was Stryer's discovery of the primary stage of amplification in visual excitation. Stryer, together with Fung and Hurley, showed that a single photoexcited rhodopsin molecule activates many molecules of transducin, which in turn activate many molecules of a cyclic GMP phosphodiesterase. Stryer's laboratory has also contributed to our understanding of the role of calcium in visual recovery and adaptation.

Stryer participated in developing light-directed, spatially addressable parallel chemical synthesis for the synthesis of peptides and polynucleotides. Light-directed combinatorial synthesis has been used by Stephen Fodor and coworkers at Affymetrix to make DNA arrays containing millions of different sequences for genetic analyses.

From 1975, Stryer authored ten editions of the textbook Biochemistry.

Stryer also chaired a National Research Council committee that produced a report entitled Bio2010: Transforming Undergraduate Education for Future Research Biologists.

== Honors ==
- American Chemical Society Award in Biological Chemistry (Eli Lilly Award in Biological Chemistry, 1970)
- American Academy of Arts and Sciences (elected 1975)
- National Academy of Sciences (elected 1984)
- American Association for the Advancement of Science Newcomb Cleveland Prize (1992)
- Honorary Doctor of Science degree, University of Chicago, 1992
- Molecular Bioanalytics Award, German Society for Biochemistry and Molecular Biology, 2002
- American Philosophical Society (2006)
- National Medal of Science (2006)
- European Inventor of the Year 2006 in the category "Small and medium-sized enterprises"

== Notable students ==
- Richard P. Haugland (Ph.D. 1970), founder of Molecular Probes, Inc.
- Richard A. Mathies (postdoc), dean of the college of chemistry, University of California, Berkeley,
- Tobias Meyer (postdoc), now professor, department of chemical and systems biology, Stanford University
- Cheng-Wen Wu (postdoc), former founding president of the Taiwan National Health Research Institutes, 1996-2005, now professor at the Taiwan Medical College.
- Jeremy M. Berg, co-author of widely used Biochemistry textbook
