= Jeremy M. Berg =

American academic (born 1958)

- Born: April 10, 1958 (age 68)
- Education: Stanford University; Harvard University
- Awards: American Chemical Society Award in Pure Chemistry (1994); Eli Lilly Award for Fundamental Research in Biological Chemistry (1995); Maryland Outstanding Young Scientist of the Year (1995); Harrison Howe Award (1997)
- Scientific career
- Workplaces: Science; University of Pittsburgh Medical Center; National Institute of General Medical Sciences; Johns Hopkins School of Medicine
- Doctoral advisor: Richard H. Holm

Jeremy Mark Berg (born April 10, 1958) is a well-known scientific researcher, administrator, communicator, and science advocate. He is currently Professor of Computational and Systems Biology at the University of Pittsburgh School of Medicine. He had previous served as Director of the Department of Biophysics and Biophysical Chemistry at Johns Hopkins University School of Medicine, Director of the National Institute of General Medical Sciences (NIGMS) at the National Institutes of Health (NIH), and Editor-in-Chief of Science magazine and the Science family of journals.

== Education ==
Berg earned his bachelor's and master's degrees from Stanford University, where he did research with Keith Hodgson and Lubert Stryer. He attained his Ph.D. under Richard H. Holm at Harvard University. He then completed a post-doctoral fellowship with Carl Pabo in biophysics at the Johns Hopkins School of Medicine.

== Career ==
Berg started his academic career in the Department of Chemistry at Johns Hopkins University in 1986. He worked on zinc finger proteins, nucleic acid binding proteins that require bound zinc ions for their structures and nucleic acid-binding properties. There, he successfully predicted the three-dimensional structure of TFIIIA-type zinc finger domains prior to the experimental determination of their structures^{,}. In 1990, he moved to become Director of the Department of Biophysics and Biophysical Chemistry at Johns Hopkins University School of Medicine at the age of 32, making him the youngest department director at Johns Hopkins since its founding four physicians. In 2003, he moved to NIH to become the Director of NIGMS where he served until 2011. He then moved to the University of Pittsburgh School of Medicine, following his wife, leading breast imaging researcher Wendie A. Berg, MD, PhD where he became Professor of Computational and Systems Biology and Associate Senior Vice Chancellor for Science Strategy and Planning in the Health Sciences. In 2013, he became founding director of the University of Pittsburgh/UPMC Institute of Personalized (now Precision) Medicine. He took a leave of absence from 2016-2019 to serve as Editor-in-Chief of Science magazine and the Science family of journals.

Berg is the co-author of several leading textbooks including the textbook Biochemistry, originally written by Lubert Stryer. Biochemistry is currently in its tenth edition and is widely used by many universities around the world. Previous, he wrote Principles of Bioinorganic Chemistry with Stephen J. Lippard.

== Awards and honors ==
His honors include a Presidential Young Investigator Award (1988–1993), the American Chemical Society Award in Pure Chemistry (1993), the Eli Lilly Award for Fundamental Research in Biological Chemistry (1995), the Maryland Outstanding Young Scientist of the Year (1995), the Distinguished Service Award from the Biophysical Society (2009), the Howard K. Schachman Public Service Award from the American Society for Biochemistry and Molecular Biology (ASBMB) (2011, presented in 2010), election to the Institute of Medicine of the National Academies (now the National Academy of Medicine) (2010), a Public Service Award from the American Chemical Society (2011), election to the American Academy of Arts and Sciences, and election as ASBMB president in 2012. He also received teaching awards from both medical students and graduate students and served as an advisor to the Johns Hopkins Postdoctoral Association at the time of its founding.

== Advocacy ==
While at NIGMS, Berg worked to increase transparency about NIH and its processes. He started the first NIH institute director-written blog, the NIGMS Feedback Loop where he shared data about peer review outcomes and funding probabilities, internal processes for program development, program evaluations, and other aspects of NIGMS operations. At NIH, he developed a strong reputation for taking principled stands. NIGMS. After his departure from NIGMS, he continued these efforts as elected president of the American Society of Biochemistry and Molecular Biology in 2012. With the beginning of the second administration of Donald J. Trump, he shared information and insights about NIH operations through his Bluesky account (@jeremymberg.bsky.social) and other communication channels. He worked with current and former NIH staff members to publicize the Bethesda Declaration, a letter of dissent sent to NIH Director Jayanta Bhattacaharya. He tracked commitment of NIH funds across fiscal year 2025 when NIH was committing their appropriated funds are rates substantially lower than historical norms. The funding curves that Berg created are now updated regularly on the website grant-witness.org and on the front page of the NIH Reporter website. He wrote emails to NIH Director Bhattacharya, initially to alert him to historical NIH accomplishments and behavior and to share analyses on ongoing NIH activities. Berg shared these emails on Bluesky and put them together in a compilation called 50 Shades of Jay. Berg provide declarations in several lawsuits about historically abnormal NIH terminations of grants. Berg served on the advisory board of the advocacy organization Stand Up for Science.

== See also ==
- Lubert Stryer
- Carl Pabo
