= Biochemistry (book) =

Biochemistry textbook

Cover of the eighth edition.

Biochemistry is a common university textbook used for teaching of biochemistry. It was initially written by Lubert Stryer and published by W. H. Freeman in 1975. It has been published in regular editions since. It is commonly used as an undergraduate teaching textbook or reference work.

More recent editions have been co-written by Jeremy Berg, Justin Hines, John L. Tymoczko and Gregory J. Gatto Jr and published by Palgrave Macmillan. As of 2023, the book has been published in 10 editions. Macmillan have also published additional teaching supplements such as course materials based on the book.
