= Photobleaching =

Loss of colour by a pigment when illuminated

Photobleaching: The movie shows photobleaching of a fluorosphere. The movie is accelerated, the whole process happened during 4 minutes.

In optics, photobleaching (sometimes termed fading) is the photochemical alteration of a dye or a fluorophore molecule such that it is permanently unable to fluoresce. This is caused by cleaving of covalent bonds or non-specific reactions between the fluorophore and surrounding molecules. Such irreversible modifications in covalent bonds are caused by transition from a singlet state to the triplet state of the fluorophores. The number of excitation cycles to achieve full bleaching varies. In microscopy, photobleaching may complicate the observation of fluorescent molecules, since they will eventually be destroyed by the light exposure necessary to stimulate them into fluorescing. This is especially problematic in time-lapse microscopy.

However, photobleaching may also be used prior to applying the (primarily antibody-linked) fluorescent molecules, in an attempt to quench autofluorescence. This can help improve the signal-to-noise ratio.

Photobleaching may also be exploited to study the motion and/or diffusion of molecules, for example via the FRAP, in which movement of cellular components can be confirmed by observing a recovery of fluorescence at the site of photobleaching, or FLIP techniques, in which multiple rounds of photobleaching is done so that the spread of fluorescence loss can be observed in cell.

Loss of activity caused by photobleaching can be controlled by reducing the intensity or time-span of light exposure, by increasing the concentration of fluorophores, by reducing the frequency and thus the photon energy of the input light, or by employing more robust fluorophores that are less prone to bleaching (e.g. Cyanine Dyes, Alexa Fluors or DyLight Fluors, AttoDyes, Janelia Dyes and others). To a reasonable approximation, a given molecule will be destroyed after a constant exposure (intensity of emission X emission time X number of cycles) because, in a constant environment, each absorption-emission cycle has an equal probability of causing photobleaching.

Photobleaching is an important parameter to account for in real-time single-molecule fluorescence imaging in biophysics. At light intensities used in single-molecule fluorescence imaging (0.1-1 kW/cm^{2} in typical experimental setups), even most robust fluorophores continue to emit for up to 10 seconds before photobleaching in a single step. For some dyes, lifetimes can be prolonged 10-100 fold using oxygen scavenging systems (up to 1000 seconds with optimisation of imaging parameters and signal-to-noise). For example, a combination of Protocatechuic acid (PCA) and protocatechuate 3,4-dioxygenase (PCD) is often used as oxygen scavenging system, and that increases fluorescence lifetime by more than a minute.

Depending on their specific chemistry, molecules can photobleach after absorbing just a few photons, while more robust molecules can undergo many absorption/emission cycles before destruction:

- Green fluorescent protein: 10^{4}–10^{5} photons; 0.1–1.0 second lifetime.
- Typical organic dye: 10^{5}–10^{6} photons; 1–10 second lifetime.
- CdSe/ZnS quantum dot: 10^{8} photons; > 1,000 seconds lifetime.

This use of the term "lifetime" is not to be confused with the "lifetime" measured by fluorescence lifetime imaging.

== See also ==
- Ozone depletion
