= Mutant protein =

A mutant protein, also called a mutein, is the protein product encoded by a gene with mutation. Mutated protein can have single amino acid change (minor, but still in many cases significant change leading to disease) or wide-range amino acid changes by e.g. truncation of C-terminus after introducing premature stop codon.

== Terminology ==
Mutein is a portmanteau of mutate + protein.

== See also ==
- Site-directed mutagenesis
- Phi value analysis
- missense mutation
- nonsense mutation
- point mutation
- frameshift mutation
- silent mutation
- single-nucleotide polymorphism
