= Molecular Probes =

Molecular Probes was a biotechnology company located in Eugene, Oregon specializing in fluorescence. The company was founded in 1975 by Richard and Rosaria Haugland in their kitchen in Minnesota, then moved briefly to Texas and finally to Oregon in the early 1980s.

In 1989, Molecular Probes moved from Junction City to its current location in Eugene. While in Texas, the Hauglands developed the Texas Red dye, a rhodamine derivative. Other dyes have names that reflect their Oregon heritage, including the Oregon Green and Cascade Blue dyes, while Marina Blue and the Alexa Fluor dyes are named after the Hauglands' children, Marina and Alex.

Invitrogen bought Molecular Probes in 2003 for approximately $325 million in cash. The business subsequently became a part of Life Technologies, through the merger of Invitrogen and Applied Biosystems, and is now part of Thermo Fisher Scientific, following Thermo Fisher's acquisition of Life Technologies in 2014.
