= Texas Red =

Identifiers
CAS Number	82354-19-6
3D model (JSmol)	Interactive image
ChEBI	CHEBI:51247
ChemSpider	398742
ECHA InfoCard	100.245.455
PubChem CID	452705
UNII	KJ974F246E
CompTox Dashboard (EPA)	DTXSID90894117
- InChI: InChI=1S/C31H29ClN2O6S2/c32-41(35,36)20-9-10-21(26(17-20)42(37,38)39)27-24-15-18-5-1-11-33-13-3-7-22(28(18)33)30(24)40-31-23-8-4-14-34-12-2-6-19(29(23)34)16-25(27)31/h9-10,15-17H,1-8,11-14H2 Key: MPLHNVLQVRSVEE-UHFFFAOYSA-N; InChI=1/C31H29ClN2O6S2/c32-41(35,36)20-9-10-21(26(17-20)42(37,38)39)27-24-15-18-5-1-11-33-13-3-7-22(28(18)33)30(24)40-31-23-8-4-14-34-12-2-6-19(29(23)34)16-25(27)31/h9-10,15-17H,1-8,11-14H2 Key: MPLHNVLQVRSVEE-UHFFFAOYAU
- SMILES: C1CC2=C3C(=C4C(=C2)C(=C5C=C6CCC[N+]7=C6C(=C5O4)CCC7)C8=C(C=C(C=C8)S(=O)(=O)Cl)S(=O)(=O)[O-])CCCN3C1

Properties
Chemical formula	C_{31}H_{29}ClN_{2}O_{6}S_{2}
Molar mass	625.15 g·mol^{−1}
- Except where otherwise noted, data are given for materials in their standard state (at 25 °C [77 °F], 100 kPa). verify (what is ?) Infobox references

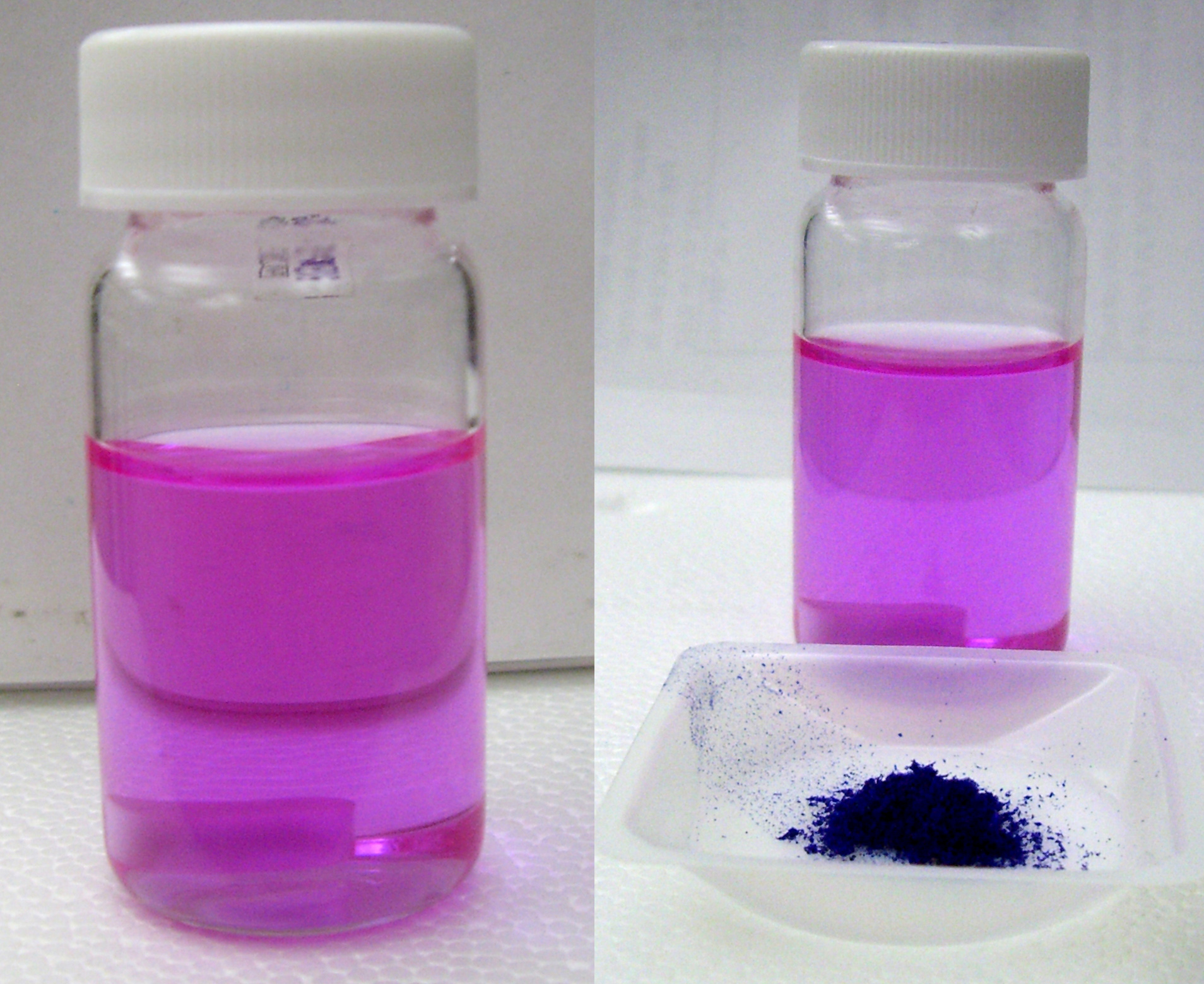
The solution in the bottle (15 ml) has 0.009 mg/ml Texas Red in DMF. Bulk powder is dark purple.

Texas Red or sulforhodamine 101 acid chloride is a red fluorescent dye, used in histology for staining cell specimens, for sorting cells with fluorescent-activated cell sorting machines, in fluorescence microscopy applications, and in immunohistochemistry. Texas Red fluoresces at about 615 nm, and the peak of its absorption spectrum is at 589 nm. The powder is dark purple. Solutions can be excited by a dye laser tuned to 595-605 nm, or less efficiently a krypton laser at 567 nm. The absorption extinction coefficient at 596 nm is about 85,000 M^{−1}cm^{−1}.

The compound is usually a mixture of two monosulfonyl chlorides, i.e., as pictured, or with the SO_{3} and SO_{2}Cl groups exchanged. It can be used as a marker of proteins, with which it easily forms conjugates via the sulfonyl chloride (SO_{2}Cl) group. In water, the sulfonyl chloride group of unreacted Texas Red molecules hydrolyses to sulfonate and the molecule becomes the very water-soluble sulforhodamine 101 which is easy to wash out selectively. This is one of the advantages of conjugating with Texas Red vs. using a rhodamine-isothiocyanate for conjugation.

A protein with the Texas Red chromophore attached can then itself act as a fluorescent labeling agent; an antibody with a fluorescent marker attached will bind to a specific antigen and then show the location of the antigens as shining spots when irradiated. It is relatively bright, and therefore can be used to detect even weakly expressed antigens. Other molecules can be labeled by Texas Red as well, e.g., various toxins. The dye dissolves very well in water as well as other polar solvents, e.g., Dimethylformamide, acetonitrile.

Texas Red, attached to a strand of DNA or RNA, can be used in fluorescence in situ hybridisation (FISH) as a molecular beacon for highlighting specific sequences of DNA. Texas Red can be linked with another fluorophore. A tandem conjugate of Texas Red with R-phycoerythrin (PE-Texas Red) is often used.

Fluorophores, like Texas Red, are commonly used in molecular biology techniques like quantitative reverse transcription polymerase chain reaction (RT-PCR) and cellular assays.

Newer rhodamine derivatives, such as Alexa 594 and DyLight 594, have been tailored to match the excitation and emission spectra of Texas Red and are used in various chemical and biological applications where greater photostability or higher fluorescence intensity are needed.
