= Dick Haugland =

American scientist

- Born: Richard Paul Haugland; July 17, 1943; Huron, South Dakota, U.S.
- Died: October 5, 2016 (aged 73); Chiang Mai, Thailand
- Education: Stanford University; Hamline University
- Organization: Richard P. Haugland Foundation
- Parent(s): Elizabeth M. (Steuber) Haugland; Nelvin E. Haugland

Richard Paul Haugland (July 17, 1943 – October 5, 2016) was an American scientist noted for his work in researching and commercializing fluorescent dyes. He completed his PhD at Stanford in 1970 under Lubert Stryer, showing in a now widely cited and classic paper that Förster resonance energy transfer (FRET) can be used as a "spectroscopic ruler" to measure distances in macromolecules. Haugland founded Molecular Probes in 1975 and continued as its president after the corporation was bought by Invitrogen in 2003. He is the original author of the authoritative volume on molecular probes, The Molecular Probes Handbook, now in its 11th edition.

== Personal ==
Dick Haugland was born in Huron, South Dakota. His parents were Elizabeth M. (Steuber) Haugland and Nelvin E. Haugland. He has one sister, Barbara A. (Haugland) Felker, who lives in Bloomington, Minnesota.

Richard Haugland received all of his primary and secondary school education in Faribault, Minnesota. He graduated number four in his high school class of 192 students in June 1961 and enrolled at Hamline University in St. Paul, Minnesota. At Hamline University he majored in chemistry. He received a B.S. degree cum laude with distinction in chemistry in June 1965.

In September 1965 Richard Haugland became a graduate student in the chemistry department of Stanford University. His Ph.D. advisor was Dr. Lubert Stryer, a prominent biophysicist. His research at Stanford was a combination of organic synthesis of novel fluorescent dyes and experimental proofs of the theory of fluorescence resonance energy transfer (FRET), a physical effect that permits measurement of distances in the range of the size of proteins. Two classic papers resulted from this collaboration:

1. Stryer, L., Haugland, R.P. "Energy Transfer: A Spectroscopic Ruler." Proc. Natl. Acad. Sci. U.S.A. 58, 719–726 (1967).

2. Haugland, R.P., Yguerabide, J., Stryer, L. "Dependence of the Kinetics of Singlet-Singlet Energy Transfer on Spectral Overlap." Proc. Natl. Acad. Sci. U.S.A. 63, 23–30 (1969).

Richard Haugland dropped out of graduate school from April 1967 to June 1968 to serve as a volunteer in the Volunteers in Service to America (VISTA) program (now called AmeriCorps VISTA). His service was in the L’Anse–Baraga area of the Upper Peninsula of Michigan in an American Indian (Chippewa/Ojibwe) area.

He completed his research at Stanford University in December 1968 and worked for eight months as a chemist at Syntex in Palo Alto CA. He left Syntex and in December 1969 moved into an abandoned cabin at Bad Medicine Lake near Park Rapids, Minnesota. While in the cabin, he finished writing his Ph.D. thesis by the light of a kerosene lamp. He received his Ph.D. degree from Stanford University in June 1970.

In March to June 1970 he was an unpaid volunteer at Pine Point Elementary School in Ponsford, Minnesota where he taught grades five and six. During the following school year and part of the subsequent school year he taught mathematics to the American Indian (Chippewa/Ojibwe) children in the school and developed basic mathematics instructional materials.

In June 1972 he became a postdoctoral fellow with Dr. Manuel Morales, a biophysicist in the Cardiovascular Research Institute (CVRI) at the University of California, San Francisco. While there, he continued the synthesis of novel fluorescent dyes and did fluorescence-based studies of contractile proteins.

He met Dr. Rosaria P. Brivio, a biochemistry postdoctoral fellow with Dr. Manuel Morales at the CVRI and they were married on November 22, 1972. They have two children, Marina Elizabeth Haugland Martin, born August 29, 1975, who is a medical doctor now at Stanford University, and Alexander David Haugland, born October 20, 1976, who now lives in Eugene, Oregon.

Richard Haugland returned to be an assistant professor of chemistry at Hamline University from September 1975 to June 1978. While there, he taught organic chemistry and general chemistry. His previous professors while a Hamline University student (Drs. Olaf Runquist, Rodney Olson and Clifford Creswell) were now his colleagues.

During his first year as a professor at Hamline University, Richard and Rosaria Haugland founded Molecular Probes. Richard Haugland received an outstanding achievement award from Hamline University in 1998 and Richard and Rosaria Haugland each received honorary doctorates from Hamline University in June 2006. He died on October 5, 2016, from brain cancer in Thailand, where he resided.

== Molecular Probes ==
Molecular Probes was founded by Drs. Richard and Rosaria Haugland while Richard Haugland was an assistant professor of chemistry at Hamline University. The intention of Molecular Probes was to make available for research purposes fluorescent dyes that would be of utility for biomedical research applications and that were not available from other sources. The company relocated from Roseville, Minnesota to Plano, Texas in July 1978 where it was incorporated. Molecular Probes remained in Plano until it moved to a remote site in the woods outside Junction City, Oregon in July 1982. Molecular Probes relocated into the city of Eugene, Oregon in 1988 where it remains today.

Richard Haugland was president, research director and marketing director of Molecular Probes Inc. until August 2002 and then Corporate Research Director until August 2003 when Molecular Probes was sold to Invitrogen of Carlsbad, California. Invitrogen was subsequently sold to Thermo-Fisher Scientific in April 2013. While at Molecular Probes, Richard Haugland was a named inventor on approximately 80 United States patents and their numerous foreign patent equivalents. He also published approximately 150 scientific papers in chemistry, biochemistry and biophysics.

At Molecular Probes, Richard Haugland authored the first nine editions of the Handbook of Fluorescent Probes and Research Chemicals, which became the “bible” for researchers in the field of fluorescence.

On April 24, 2002, Drs. Richard Haugland and Lubert Stryer received the 2002 Molecular Bioanalytic award sponsored by Roche Diagnostics GmbH in association with the German Society for Biochemistry and Molecular Biology (GBM). The award was for their “Outstanding achievements in the field of fluorescence resonance energy transfer (FRET). The core of this work was principally accomplished while Richard Haugland was a graduate student at Stanford University but both Drs. Haugland and Stryer made additional contributions to the technology subsequent to those years.

== US Foundations and their Philanthropic Activities ==
Drs. Richard and Rosaria Haugland started the Haugland Foundation in 1998 to fund charitable activities in health, education and cultural areas. Most of the funds for the Haugland Foundation came from the profits of Molecular Probes. The Haugland Foundation and Molecular Probes became major sponsors of cultural activities in the Eugene, OR area including the Eugene Ballet, Eugene Opera, Oregon Contemporary Theater and other local groups. The foundation also supported Hamline University, the University of Oregon, Lane Community College and several other programs.

When Molecular Probes was sold to Invitrogen in August 2003, the Haugland Foundation was renamed the Richard P. Haugland Foundation and half the assets of the original Haugland Foundation were transferred to the new Rosaria P. Haugland Foundation. The Rosaria P. Haugland Foundation continues to support programs that are mostly in the Eugene, Oregon area but the Richard P. Haugland Foundation now concentrates its funding on support of programs in Asia, particularly in Thailand, Cambodia, Laos, Nepal, The Philippines and India.

In 2003, Richard Haugland also started a directed fund that is administered by the Oregon Community Foundation. The money in this fund is principally used to make annual unrestricted grants to Hamline University and to continue to support the Eugene Ballet, Eugene Opera, Oregon Contemporary Theater, Skipping Stones, Womenspace and HIV Alliance in Eugene, Oregon.

In December 2008, Richard Haugland gave approximately $10.4 million to start the new International Medica Foundation. The objective of the International Medica Foundation is to reintroduce a vaccine for rotavirus, a virus that causes severe diarrhea and kills approximately 600,000 children a year worldwide. The International Medica Foundation has conducted a major clinical trial of this vaccine in Ghana.

From 2013 the Richard P. Haugland Foundation has supported education and healthcare related programs in Thailand, Cambodia, Philippines, India, Bangladesh and Nepal through the Firetree Asia Foundation, helping over 300,000 children. The Firetree Asia Foundation aims to ensure effective due diligence on the organizations supported and provides strategic and technical support to ensure the effectiveness of the programs.

The Richard P. Haugland Foundation was dissolved in early 2017 and its assets transferred to two successor foundations: the Starfish Education Foundation, which will continue supporting education programs in Thailand through the management of schools and learning centers as well as the development of curricula and solution to improve the professional development of educators, and the Tondo Foundation, which will carry on Richard's legacy by building solutions to the education, healthcare and protection problems faced by children and youth living in Asia.

== Thailand and Early Education Curriculum Development ==
RHAUGLAND.theora

Following sale of Molecular Probes to Invitrogen in August 2003, Richard Haugland spent much of 2004 in Thailand where he volunteered at Moo Baan Dek, a home and school for orphans and needy children located west of Kanchanaburi, which is northwest of Bangkok. During that period, he was also a consultant for Invitrogen/Molecular Probes.

His interest in Thailand started with a family trip to Thailand with a Stanford University Alumni Association group in 1988. He and Rosaria Haugland sponsored foster children in the poor northeast Thailand region (Isan) and in other countries for almost 40 years through Plan International and he had visited these Thai foster children almost annually.

Based on his experience and interests in early childhood education that extended back to his days as a volunteer at Pine Point Indian School (1970 to 1972), Richard Haugland decided to develop unique multi-media teaching methods and materials. This interest eventually resulted in curriculum development for teaching of mathematics and the English (Thaiglish) and Thai languages to preschool and primary school children.
