= Dye tracing =

Method of tracking fluid flow

Dye tracing is a method of tracking and tracing various flows using dye as a flow tracer when added to a liquid. Dye tracing may be used to analyse the flow of the liquid or the transport of objects within the liquid. Dye tracking may be either qualitative, showing the presence of a particular flow, or quantitative, when the amount of the traced dye is measured by special instruments.

== Fluorescent dyes ==
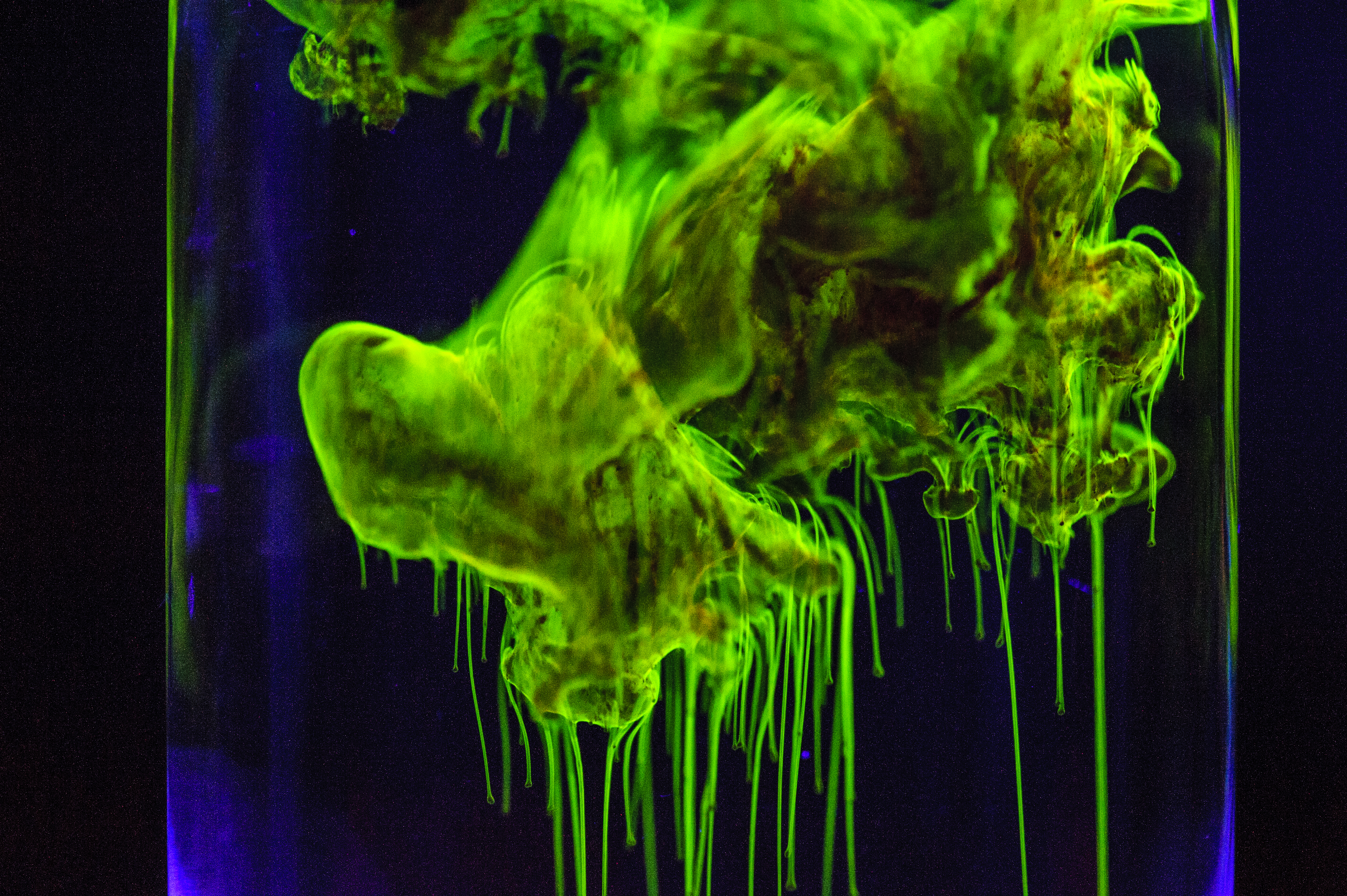
Fluorescein in ammonia solution (2)

Fluorescent dyes are often used in situations where there is insufficient lighting (e.g., sewers or cave waters), and where precise quantitative data are required (measured by a fluorometer).

In 1871, fluorescein was among the first fluorescent dyes to be developed. Its disodium salt (under the trademark "uranine") was developed several years later and still remains among the best tracer dyes.

Other popular tracer dyes are rhodamine, pyranine and sulforhodamine B.

=== Quantitative tracing ===
Carbon sampling was the first method of technology-assisted dye tracing that was based on the absorption of dye in charcoal. Charcoal packets may be placed along the expected route of the flow, later the collected dye may be chemically extracted and its amount subjectively evaluated.

Filter fluorometers were the first devices that could detect dye concentrations beyond human eye sensitivity.

Spectrofluorometers, developed in the mid-1980s, made it possible to perform advanced analysis of fluorescence.

Filter fluorometers and spectrofluorometers identify the intensity of fluorescence that is present in a liquid sample. Different dyes and chemicals produce a distinctive wavelength that is determined during analysis.

=== Tracing methods ===
Each sampling area is analysed by a quantitative instrument to test the background fluorescence.

Each different type of dye has significant performance factors that distinguish them in different environments. These performance factors include:

- Resistance to absorption
- Surface water loss
- Limitations of use in acidic waters

Depending on the environment, water flows possess certain factors that can affect how a dye performs. Natural fluorescence in a water flow can interfere with certain dyes. The presence of organic material, other chemicals, and sunlight can affect the intensity of dyes.

== Applications ==
=== Water tracing ===
Typical applications of water flow tracing include:

- Plumbing/piping tracing
- Leak detection
- Checking for illegal tapping
- Pollution studies
- Natural waterflow analysis (rivers, lakes, ocean currents, cave waterflows, karst studies, groundwater filtration, etc.)
- Sewer and stormwater drainage analysis

=== Medicine and biology ===
Dye tracing may be used for the analysis of blood circulation within various parts of the human or animal body. For example, fluorescent angiography, a technique of analysis of circulation in retina is used for diagnosing various eye diseases.

With modern fluorometers, capable of tracking single fluorescent molecules, it is possible to track migrations of single cells tagged by a fluorescent molecule (see fluorescein in biological research). For example, the fluorescent-activated cell sorting in flow cytometry makes it possible to sort out the cells with attached fluorescent molecules from a flow.

== See also ==
- Fluorescence microscope
- FLEX mission
- Green fluorescent protein
- Float tracking
- Streakline
