= Kadangha Limbiyè Bariki =

Togolese diplomat

Kadangha Limbiyè Bariki is a Togolese diplomat who has been Togo's ambassador to the United States since July 2009.

A career diplomat, Bariki was director of the Cabinet of Foreign Minister Koffi Panou in the early 2000s. Later, he worked as a technical adviser under Foreign Minister Koffi Esaw until he was appointed as Ambassador to the United States. Bariki presented his credentials as ambassador to United States President Barack Obama on 20 July 2009, thereby filling a post that had been vacant since the departure of Pascal Bodjona in early 2005. When presenting his credentials, Bariki said that he would "work in your country with faith, loyalty and determination to help build good relations of cooperation between Togo and the United States" and he asked Obama to be "a tireless advocate of a more humane society for Togo, Africa, and the Third World". He also stressed the political reconciliation process and reforms taking place in Togo. Obama, in turn, urged the Togolese government to improve democracy and living standards and professionalize the military; he also said that the 2010 presidential election would be "a democratic test for Togo".
