= Sonde =

Sonde (French for probe) may refer to:

== Electronic probes ==
- CTD (instrument), a type of water quality sensor
- Ionosonde, a radar for examining the ionosphere
- Radiosonde, a piece of equipment used on weather balloons
- Rocketsonde, a sounding rocket for atmospheric observations
- Dropsonde, a weather reconnaissance device

== Places ==
- Sonde, Togo, a town in Togo
- Sonde, Taungtha, a place in Taungtha Township, Burma (Myanmar)
- Sonde, Uganda, a settlement in Mukono District, Uganda

== Other uses ==
- Sonde (music group), a music ensemble based in Montreal
- Sonde language, either of two Bantu languages of the Democratic Republic of the Congo

== See also ==
- Sondes (surname)
- Sonda (disambiguation)
- Sounding (disambiguation)
- Probe (disambiguation)
