= Micro-spectrophotometry =

Microspectrophotometry is the measure of the spectra of microscopic samples using different wavelengths of electromagnetic radiation (e.g. ultraviolet, visible and near infrared, etc.) It is accomplished with microspectrophotometers, cytospectrophotometers, microfluorometers, Raman microspectrophotometers, etc. A microspectrophotometer can be configured to measure transmittance, absorbance, reflectance, light polarization, fluorescence (or other types of luminescence such as photoluminescence) of sample areas less than a micrometer in diameter through a modified optical microscope.

== Applications ==
The main reason to use microspectrophotometry is the ability to measure the optical spectra of samples with a spatial resolution on the micron scale. Optical spectra may be acquired of either microscopic samples or larger samples with a micron-scale spatial resolution. Another reason microspectrophotometry is useful is that measurements are made without destroying the samples. This is important when dealing with stained/unstained histological or cytochemical biological sections, when measuring film thickness in semi-conductor integrated circuits, when matching paints and fibers (forensic science), when studying gems and coal (geology), and in paint/ink/color analysis in paint chemistry or art-work.

== Variations ==
An advantage of the 'microscope spectrometer' is its ability to use microscope apertures to precisely control the area of sample analysis. Flat capillaries can be used for analyzing small liquid samples, up to about 10 micro-liters in volume. Quartz or mirror-based optics can be used for studying samples from the ultraviolet (UV), down to 200 nm, to the near infrared (NIR) up to 2100 nm. Samples that emit electromagnetic radiation via fluorescence, phosphorescence or photoluminescence when exposed to light, can be quantitatively investigated using a variety of excitation and barrier filters. A variety of observations can be made on samples of interest by using different illumination sources such as halogen, xenon, deuterium and mercury lamps. Plane polarized light can also be used for studying birefringent samples.

== See also ==
- Fluorescence spectroscopy
- Infrared spectroscopy
- Microfluorimetry
- Raman Microspectrosopy
- Spectrophotometry
- Ultraviolet-visible Microspectroscopy
- Ultraviolet
