= Koffi Panou =

Togolese politician

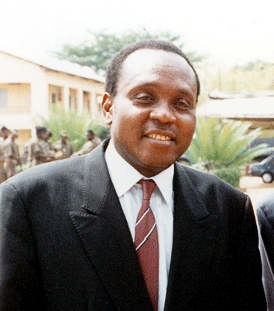
Panou in Lomé, 1994

Koffi Panou (January 31, 1947 – March 15, 2003) was a Togolese politician and diplomat who served in the government under President Gnassingbé Eyadéma.

Panou, who was from Lacs Prefecture in southern Togo, graduated from ESIJY in Yaoundé, Cameroon in the 1970s and worked as a journalist. He became Director of National Television in 1986, then was a Special Advisor to the President. After serving as Secretary-General of the Presidency, he was named Minister of Foreign Affairs in 1996, in which position he served until September 1, 1998, when he was named Minister of Communication and Civic Education. After two years in the latter position, he was again named Minister of Foreign Affairs on October 8, 2000. He was a member of the West African mediation group during the Ivorian Civil War and participated in the cease-fire negotiations. He remained Foreign Minister until being replaced by Roland Kpotsra in the government named on December 3, 2002.

Panou, who had been ill and had been to France for treatment at Val-de-Grâce Military Hospital, died of a heart attack on March 15, 2003 in Kara Region. He was participating in a traditional dance at the funeral of his mother, who had died in 1999, in Kabou, Bassar Prefecture, when he fell ill, and he died while he was being taken for treatment. His national funeral was held in Lomé on March 27. The funeral oration speech was performed by Charles Kondi Agba, a government minister.
