= Esaw (surname) =

Esaw is a surname. Notable people with the surname include:

- Johnny Esaw (1925–2013), Canadian sports broadcaster and television network executive
- Kofi Esaw, Togolese politician and diplomat
