= Sounding =

Sounding or soundings may refer to:

- Sounding (archaeology), a test dig in archaeology
- "Sounding" (Justified), an episode of the TV series Justified
- Soundings (journal), an academic journal of leftist political thinking
- Soundings (radio drama), science fiction radio drama series produced from 1985 to 1989 in Ottawa
- Soundings (Williams), 2003 orchestral composition by John Williams
- Soundings (Carter), 2005 orchestral composition by Elliott Carter
- Sound (medical instrument), instruments for probing and dilating passages within the body
  - Urethral sounding, using sounds to increase the inner diameter of the urethra
- Atmospheric sounding, a measurement of the vertical distribution of physical properties of the atmospheric column
- Depth sounding, a measurement of depth within a body of water
- Whale sounding, the act of diving by whales
- The Sounding, a film

== See also ==
- Sound (disambiguation)
- Sonde (disambiguation)
- Sonar, use of sound propagation to navigate, communicate with or detect objects on or under water
- Remote sensing, acquisition of information about an object or phenomenon without making physical contact with it
- Cone penetration test, a method used to determine the geotechnical engineering properties of soils
