= List of ambassadors of Togo to the United States =

Coordinates: 38°54′41.1″N 77°2′57.76″W

Ambassador of Togo to the United States Embassy of Togo in Washington, D.C.
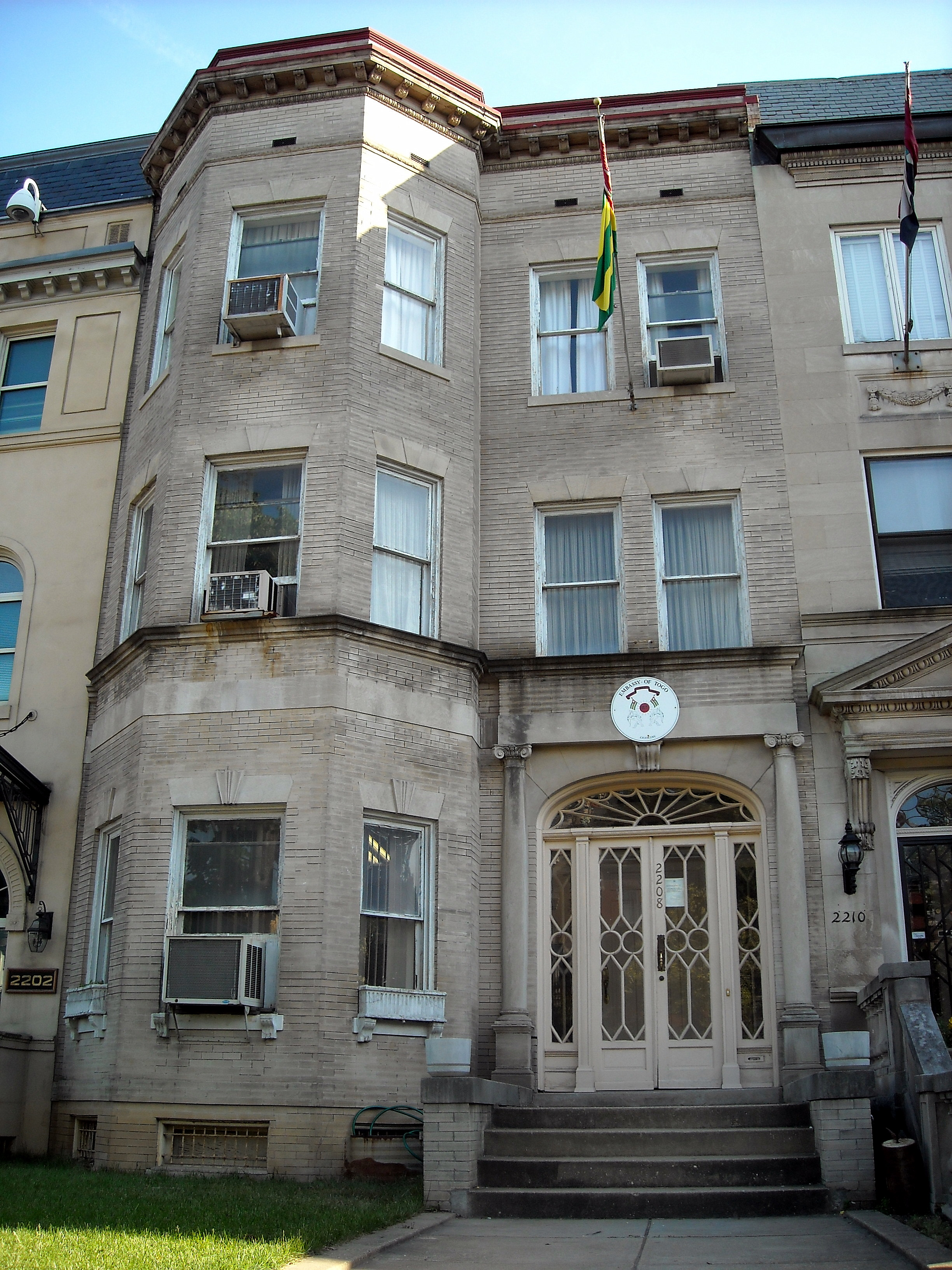
- Incumbent; Kadangha Limbiyè Bariki since July 20, 2009
- Inaugural holder: Andre Akakpo
- Formation: November 3, 1960

The Togolese Ambassador in Washington, D. C. is the official representative of the Government in Lomé to the Government of the United States.

== List of ambassadors ==
Diplomatic agreement/designated	Diplomatic accreditation	Ambassador	Observations	List of presidents of Togo	List of presidents of the United States	Term end
November 3, 1960			Embassy opened	Sylvanus Olympio	Dwight D. Eisenhower	
October 18, 1960	November 3, 1960	Andre Akakpo		Sylvanus Olympio	Dwight D. Eisenhower	
August 28, 1964	September 18, 1964	Robert Ajavon		Nicolas Grunitzky	Lyndon B. Johnson	
June 16, 1967	July 27, 1967	Alexandre John Ohin	MD, Togolese surgeon, diplomat, married 1962, Patience Ayivor, three daughters, two sons	Étienne Eyadéma	Lyndon B. Johnson	
May 18, 1971	May 18, 1971	Epiphane Ayi Mawussi		Étienne Eyadéma	Richard Nixon	
April 15, 1974		Parfait A. Dagba	Chargé d'affaires	Gnassingbé Eyadéma	Gerald Ford	
May 16, 1974	June 5, 1974	Michel Messanvi Kekeh	Michel Messanvi Kokou Kekeh	Gnassingbé Eyadéma	Gerald Ford	
April 2, 1979		Komla Eli Djelou	Chargé d'affaires	Gnassingbé Eyadéma	Jimmy Carter	
April 19, 1979	May 10, 1979	Yao Grunitzky		Gnassingbé Eyadéma	Jimmy Carter	
August 10, 1983	October 13, 1983	Ellom-Kodjo Schuppius		Gnassingbé Eyadéma	Ronald Reagan	
November 17, 1994	November 21, 1994	Kossivi Osseyi		Gnassingbé Eyadéma	Bill Clinton	
May 27, 1998		Pascal Bodjona	Akoussoulelou Bodjona	Gnassingbé Eyadéma	Bill Clinton	2005
July 14, 2009	July 20, 2009	Kadangha Limbiyè Bariki	Edawe Limbaye Kadanghe Bariki	Faure Gnassingbé	Barack Obama	

- Togo–United States relations
