= Tikare =

Tikare may refer to:

- Tikarè, Togo
- Tikaré, Burkina Faso
- Tikaré Department, Burkina Faso

== See also ==
- Tikar people, several ethnic groups in Cameroon
