= Lanthanide probes =

Non-invasive analytical tool

Lanthanide probes are a non-invasive analytical tool commonly used for biological and chemical applications. Lanthanides are metal ions which have their 4f energy level filled and generally refer to elements cerium to lutetium in the periodic table. The fluorescence of lanthanide salts is weak because the energy absorption of the metallic ion is low. Chelated complexes of lanthanides are most commonly used. Fluorescence is most intense when the metal ion has a +3 oxidation state. Not all lanthanide metals can be used and the most common are: Sm(III), Eu(III), Tb(III), and Dy(III).

== History of fluorescence in lanthanide compounds ==
It has been known since the early 1930s that the salts of certain lanthanides are fluorescent. The reaction of lanthanide salts with nucleic acids was discussed in a number of publications during the 1930s and the 1940s where lanthanum-containing reagents were employed for the fixation of nucleic acid structures. In 1942 complexes of europium, terbium, and samarium were discovered to exhibit unusual luminescence properties when excited by UV light. However, the first staining of biological cells with lanthanides occurred twenty years later when bacterial smears of E. coli were treated with aqueous solutions of a europium complex, which under mercury lamp illumination appeared as bright red spots. Attention to lanthanide probes increased greatly in the mid-1970s when Finnish researchers proposed Eu(III), Sm(III), Tb(III), and Dy(III) polyaminocarboxylates as luminescent sensors in time-resolved luminescent (TRL) immunoassays. Optimization of analytical methods from the 1970s onward for lanthanide chelates and time-resolved luminescence microscopy (TRLM) resulted in the use of lanthanide probes in many scientific, medical and commercial fields.

== Techniques ==
There are two main assaying techniques: heterogeneous and homogeneous. If two lanthanide chelates are used in the analysis one after the other—it is called heterogeneous assaying. The first analyte is linked to a specific binding agent on a solid support such as a polymer and then another reaction couples the first poorly luminescent lanthanide complex with a new better one. This tedious method is used because the second more luminescent compound would not bind without the first analyte already present. Subsequent time resolved detection of the metal-centered luminescent probe yields the desired signal. Antigens, steroids and hormones are routinely assayed with heterogeneous techniques. Homogeneous assays rely on direct coupling of the lanthanide label with an organic acceptor.

The relaxation of excited molecules states often occurs by the emission of light which is called fluorescence. There are two ways of measuring this emitted radiation: as a function of frequency (inverse to wavelength) or time. Conventionally the fluorescence spectrum shows the intensity of fluorescence at different wavelengths, but since lanthanides have relatively long fluorescence decay times (ranging from one microsecond to one millisecond), it is possible to record the fluorescence emission at different decay times from the given excitation energy at time zero. This is called time resolved fluorescence spectroscopy.

== Mechanism ==
Lanthanides can be used because their small size (ionic radius) gives them the ability to replace metal ions inside protein complex such as calcium or nickel. The optical properties of lanthanide ions such as Ln(III) originate in the special features of their electronic [Xe]4f^{n} configurations. These configurations generate many electronic levels, the number of which is given by [14!/n!(14−n)!], translating into 3003 energy levels for Eu(III) and Tb(III).

The energies of these levels are well defined due to the shielding of the 4f orbitals by the filled 5s and 5p sub-shells, and are not very sensitive to the chemical environments in which the lanthanide ions are inserted. Inner-shell 4f-4f transitions span both the visible and near-infrared ranges. They are sharp and easily recognizable. Since these transitions are parity forbidden, the lifetimes of the excited states are long, which allows the use of time resolved spectroscopy, a definitive asset for bioassays and microscopy. The only drawback of f-f transitions are their faint oscillator strengths which may in fact be turned into an advantage.

The energy absorbed by the organic receptor (ligand) is transferred onto Ln(III) excited states, and sharp emission bands originating from the metal ion are detected after rapid internal conversion to the emitting level. The phenomenon is termed sensitization of the metal centered complex (also referred to as antenna effect) and is quite complex. The energy migration path though goes through the long-lived triplet state of the ligand. Ln(III) ions are good quenchers of triplet states so that photobleaching is substantially reduced. The three types of transitions seen for lanthanide probes are: LMCT, 4f-5d, and intraconfigurational 4f-4f. The former two usually occur at energies too high to be relevant for bio-applications.

== Research topics ==
=== Proteins and nucleic acids ===
Luminescence of the Tb(III) complex with norfloxacin is sensitive to determine the concentration of phosphate released by the GTP to GDP transformation.

Hydrogen peroxide can be detected with high sensitivity by the luminescence of lanthanide probes—however only at relatively high pH values. A lanthanide-based analytical procedure was proposed in 2002 based on the finding that the europium complex with various tetracyclines binds hydrogen peroxide forming a luminescent complex.

FRET in lanthanide probes is a widely used technique to measure the distance between two points separated by approximately 15–100 Angstrom. Measurements can be done under physiological conditions in vitro with genetically encoded dyes, and often in vivo as well. The technique relies on a distant- dependent transfer of energy from a donor fluorophore to an acceptor dye. Lanthanide probes has been used to study DNA-protein interactions (using a terbium chelate complex) to measure distances in DNA complexes bent by the CAP protein. Lanthanide probes have been used to detect conformational changes in proteins. Recently the Shaker potassium ion channel, a voltage-gated channel involved in nerve impulses was measured using this technique. Some scientist also have used lanthanide based luminescence resonance energy transfer (LRET) which is very similar to FRET to study conformational changes in RNA polymerase upon binding to DNA and transcription initiation in prokaryotes. LRET was also used to study the interaction of the proteins dystrophin and actin in muscle cells. Dystrophin is present in the inner muscle cell membrane and is believed to stabilize muscle fibers by binding to actin filaments. Specifically labelled dystrophin with Tb labelled monoclonal antibodies labeled were used.

Traditional virus diagnostic procedures are being replaced by sensitive immunoassays with lanthanides. The time resolved fluorescence based technique is generally applicable and its performance has also been tested in the assay of viral antigens in clinical specimens.

=== Medical imaging ===
Several systems have been proposed which combine MRI capability with lanthanides probes in dual assays. The luminescent probe may for instance serve to localize the MRI contrast agent. This has helped to visualize the delivery of nucleic acids into cultured cells. Lanthanides are not used for their fluorescence but their magnetic qualities.

=== Biology - Receptor-ligand interactions ===
Lanthanide probes displays unique fluorescence properties, including long lifetime of fluorescence, large Stokes shift and narrow emission peak. These properties is highly advantageous to develop analytical probes for receptor-ligand interactions. Many lanthanide-based fluorescence studies have been developed for GPCRs, including CXCR1, insulin-like family peptide receptor 2, protease-activated receptor 2, β2-adrenergic receptor and C3a receptor.

== Instrumentation ==
The emitted photons from excited lanthanides are detected by highly sensitive devices and techniques such as single-photon detection. If the lifetime of the excited emitting level is long enough, then time-resolved detection (TRD) can be used to enhance the signal-to-noise ratio. The instrumentation used to perform LRET is relatively simple, although slightly more complex than conventional fluorimeters. The general requirements are a pulsed UV excitation source and time-resolved detection.

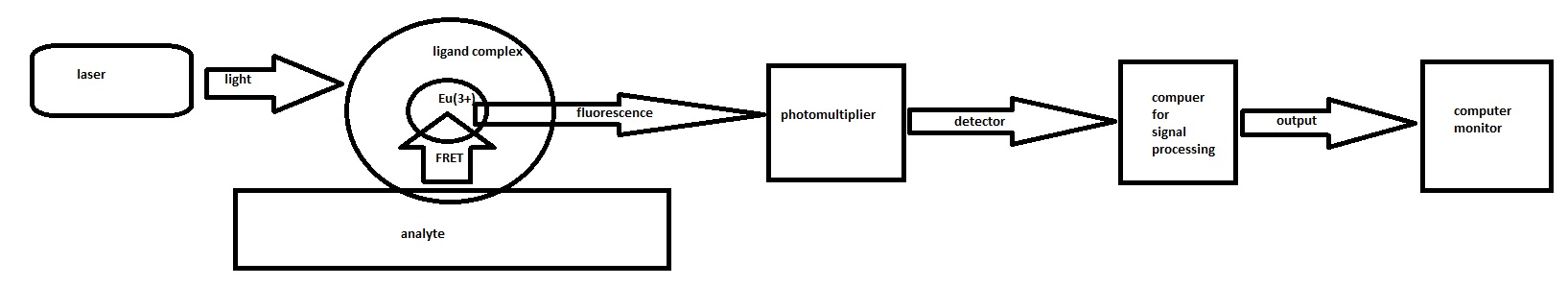

Light sources which emit short duration pulses can be divided into the following categories:

- Flash tubes
- Mechanically or electronically chopped discharge lamps
- Spark gaps
- Pulsed lasers

The most important factors in the selection of the pulsed light source for are the duration and intensity of the light. Pulsed lasers for the 300 to 500 nm range have now replaced spark caps in fluorescence spectroscopy. There are four general types of pulsing lasers used: lasers with pulsed excitation, lasers with G-switching, mode locked lasers and cavity dumped lasers. Pulsed nitrogen lasers (337 nm) have often been used as an excitation source in time resolved fluorometry.

In time resolved fluorometry the fast photomultiplier tube is the only practical single photon detector. Good single photon resolution is also an advantage in counting photons from long decay fluorescent probes, such as lanthanide chelates.

These commercial instruments are available in the market today: Perkin-Elmer Micro Filter Fluorometer LS-2, Perkin-Elmer Luminescence Spectrometer Model LS 5, and LKB-Wallac Time-Resolved Fluorometer Model 1230.

== Ligands ==
Lanthanide probes' ligands must meet several chemical requirements for the probes to work properly. These qualities are: water solubility, large thermodynamic stability at physiological pHs, kinetic inertness and absorption above 330 nm to minimize destruction of live biological materials.

The chelates which have been studied and utilized to date can be classified into the following groups:

1. Tris chelates (three ligands)
2. Tetrakis chelates (four ligands)
3. Mixed ligand complexes
4. Complexes with neutral donors
5. Others such as: phthalate, picrate, and salicylate complexes.

The efficiency of the energy transfer from the ligand to the ion is determined ligand-metal bond. The energy transfer is more efficient when bonded covalently than through ionic bonding. Substituents in the ligand which are of electron-donating such as hydroxy, methoxy and methyl groups increase the fluorescence. The opposite effect is seen when an electron-withdrawing group (such as nitro) is attached. Furthermore, the fluorescence intensity is increased by fluorine substitution to the ligand. The energy transfer to the metal ion increases as the electronegativity of the fluorinated group makes the europium-oxygen bond of a more covalent nature. Increased conjugation by aromatic substituents by replacing phenyl by naphtyl groups is shown to enhance fluorescence.

== See also ==
- Spectroscopy
- Fluorometry
- Enzymes
- Biosensor
- MRI contrast agent
