= Robert Dussey =

Togolese politician and minister

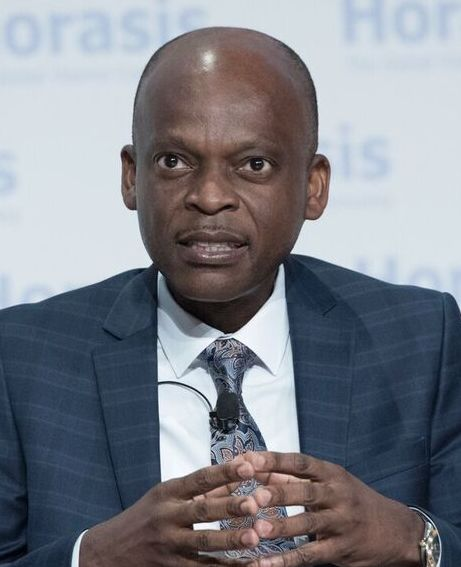
- Dussey speaking at the Horasis Global Meeting; Portuguese Riviera, 2017.

Minister of Foreign Affairs, Cooperation and African Integration of Togo
- Incumbent
- Assumed office 28 June 2015
- President: Faure Gnassingbé
- Prime Minister: Komi Sélom Klassou
- In office 17 September 2013 – 22 May 2015
- President: Faure Gnassingbé
- Prime Minister: Kwesi Ahoomey-Zunu
- Preceded by: Eliot Ohin

Personal details
- Born: 4 January 1972 (age 54) Bangui, Central African Republic

Robert Dussey (born 4 January 1972) is a Togolese politician and minister. Since 17 September 2013, he is the Minister of Foreign Affairs, Cooperation and African Integration of Togo. He entered the second government of Kwesi Ahoomey-Zunu, remained in the Government of Komi Selom Klassou from 28 June 2015 to 4 January 2019, and still serves as the Minister of Foreign Affairs, African integration and Togolese abroad.

He served as chief negotiator for the ACP Group of States in the ACP–EU negotiations for the post-Cotonou Agreement in 2020. In recognition of his role alongside Togolese head of state Faure Gnassingbé in efforts to resolve the political crisis in Mali, he was decorated in 2023 by the head of the Malian Transition, Assimi Goïta.

Appointed Commander of the Order of the Stallion of Burkina Faso, a distinction conferred on 6 July 2026 in Ouagadougou during a ceremony presided over by President Ibrahim Traoré, Robert Dussey has also been involved in several diplomatic initiatives led by Togo within the African Union and the United Nations. In 2026, Togo led the Correct the Map initiative, backed by the African Union, which aims to promote map projections that more accurately represent the relative land areas of Africa and other regions of the world. On 4 September 2026, the initiative was presented and defended before the United Nations General Assembly on behalf of the African Group.

== Biography ==
Born 4 January 1972 in Bangui, Central African Republic, Dussey was a seminarian (Saint Paul Seminary of Bangui); Franciscan friar and monk of the Catholic Community of the Beatitudes.

A professor of political philosophy and Kantian, Dussey is a specialist in issues of peace, management, and resolution of armed conflicts.

== Political career ==
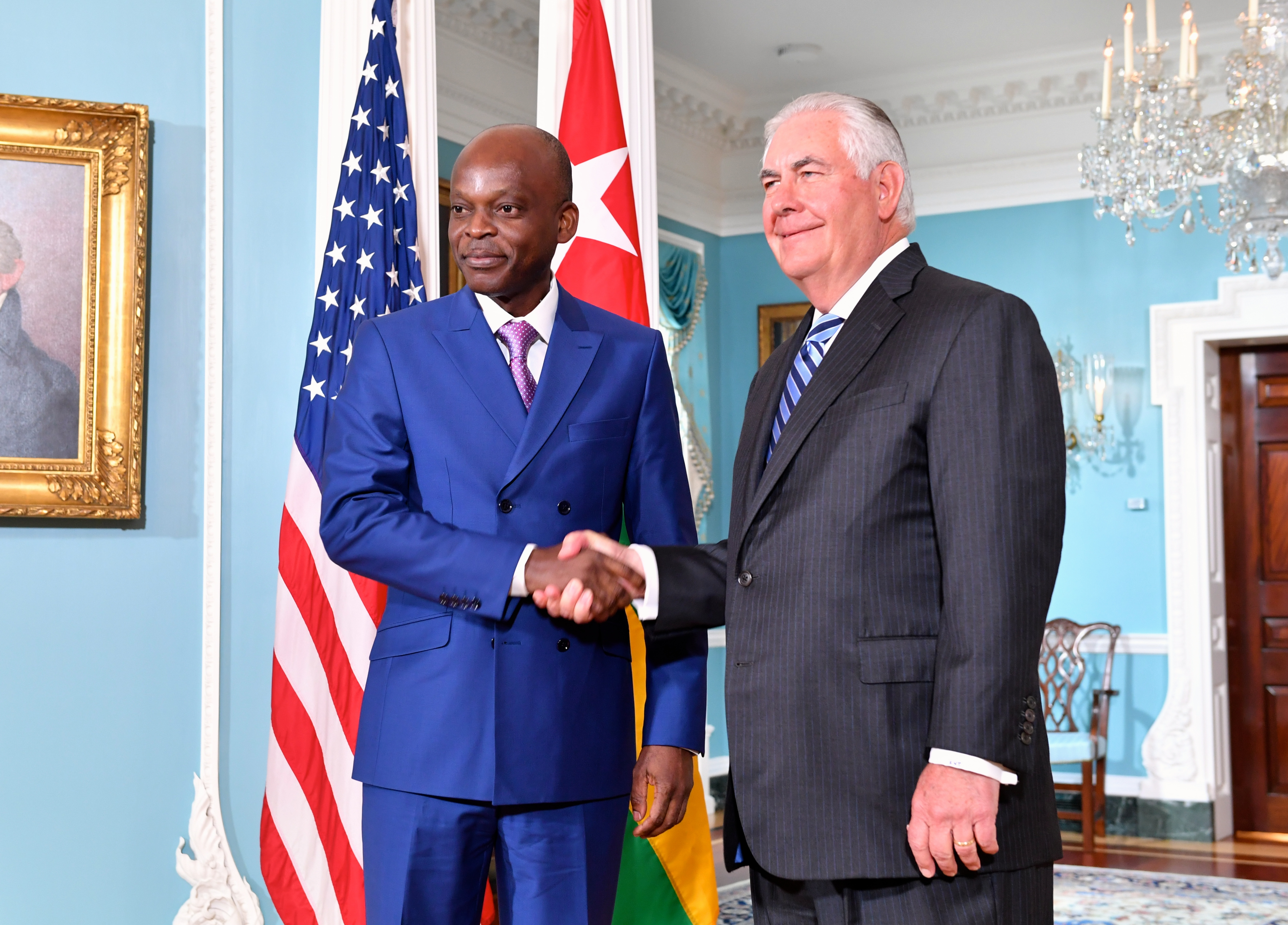
Robert Dussey and Rex Tillerson

From 2005 to 2013, Dussey acted as the diplomatic advisor to the President Faure Gnassingbé. Since September 2013, he became responsible for the Ministry of Foreign Affairs, Cooperation and African Integration of Togo.

In 2018, in the context of the ACP-EU negotiations for Post-Cotonou 2020, Dussey was appointed chief negotiator of the ACP Group. The ACP-EU Post-Cotonou 2020 negotiations officially started on 28 September 2018 in New York.

In February 2025, the African Union Assembly adopted Decision Assembly/AU/Dec.934(XXXVIII), on a proposal submitted by Togo, concerning the qualification of slavery, deportation and colonization as crimes against humanity and genocide against the peoples of Africa.

In February 2026, at its 39th Ordinary Session, the African Union Assembly adopted Decision Assembly/AU/Dec.959(XXXIX) on the initiative "Correcting the Map of Africa on the Globe", an item proposed by the Republic of Togo. The decision commended Togo for its commitment and supported the promotion of equal-area map projections, including the Equal Earth projection.

On 4 September 2026, Dussey introduced and defended before the United Nations General Assembly, on behalf of the African Group, draft resolution A/80/L.104, entitled "Correct the Map: Rebalancing global cartographic representation and promoting equitable representation of the world's regions, particularly Africa". The General Assembly adopted the resolution by 164 votes in favour to one against, with six abstentions.

== Distinctions ==
- Ranked in 2015, 2016, and 2019 by the magazine "NewAfrican" on the list of the 100 most influential personalities on the African continent
- Knight of the Legion of Honor of France in 2012
- Officer of the Order of Mono of the Togolese Republic in 2018
- International Human Rights Prize 2021-2022 in Islamabad, Pakistan in 2022
- Commander of the National Order of Mali on a foreign basis in 2023
- 2026: Commander of the Ordre de l'Étalon (Order of the Stallion) of Burkina Faso, conferred in Ouagadougou on 6 July 2026 during a ceremony presided over by Burkina Faso's head of state, Ibrahim Traoré.

== Bibliography ==
- Life without life: novel, Editions Bognini, Abidjan 2000
- For lasting peace in Africa: advocacy for an African conscience of armed conflict, Editions Bognini, 2002
- Thinking reconciliation in Togo, Editions Bognini, Abidjan 2003
- Africa sick of its politicians: Unconsciousness, irresponsibility, ignorance or innocence?, Jean Picollec, 2008
- A comedy in the tropics, L'Harmattan, 2011
- A Tragic Fate, digital book, co-edition NENA/Éditions Continents, 2022.
- Le Bouc, Éditions Alpha-Omega, 2024.
- The Goat, English-language edition of Le Bouc, Kindle e-book, 2026.
- From Negotiations to the Signing of the Samoa Agreement, Acoria Éditions, Paris, 2026.

=== Articles ===
==== Articles listed in independent bibliographic sources ====
- "Pluralisme politique et démocratie en Afrique : l’approche éducationnelle" ["Political pluralism and democracy in Africa: the educational approach"], Le Cahier philosophique d’Afrique. Revue internationale de philosophie, vol. 1, no. 1, 2004, pp. 27–44.
- "La conception dionysienne de la paix et son fondement ontologique chez Proclus" ["The Dionysian conception of peace and its ontological foundation in Proclus"], Le Cahier philosophique d’Afrique. Revue internationale de philosophie, vol. 1, no. 1, 2007, pp. 125–136.
- "Les limites du pacifisme juridique de Kant" ["The limits of Kant's legal pacifism"], Le Cahier philosophique d’Afrique. Revue internationale de philosophie, vol. 1, no. 1, 2012, pp. 125–142.
- "La piraterie maritime : quels enjeux pour le golfe de Guinée ?" ["Maritime piracy: what is at stake for the Gulf of Guinea?"], Géoéconomie, no. 68, 2014, pp. 171–176.

==== Other articles listed on Dussey's official website ====
- "Absence d’ordre et hasard : l’État de nature chez Hobbes" ["Absence of order and chance: the state of nature in Hobbes"], Koré, Revue ivoirienne de philosophie, no. 31, 2001, pp. 5–15.
- "La fonction de l’État de droit dans la philosophie de Karl Popper" ["The function of the rule of law in Karl Popper's philosophy"], Annales de l’Université de Lomé, series Lettres et sciences humaines, no. XXI, 2001, pp. 179–197, ISSN 1016-9202.
- "Paix et raison : la conception kantienne de la paix et son actualité" ["Peace and reason: Kant's conception of peace and its relevance today"], Repère, Revue scientifique de l’Université de Bouaké, July 2002, pp. 22–40, ISSN 1817-177X.
- "Armées africaines et défis démocratiques" ["African armies and democratic challenges"], Annales de l’Université de Lomé, series Lettres et sciences humaines, no. XXII, 2002, pp. 41–57, ISSN 1016-9202.
- "Le statut de la paix et de la guerre dans la philosophie de Thomas Hobbes" ["The status of peace and war in the philosophy of Thomas Hobbes"], Annales de l’Université de Lomé, series Lettres et sciences humaines, no. XXIII, 2003, pp. 43–56, ISSN 1016-9202.
- "La morale kantienne et la question des droits de l’homme" ["Kantian morality and the question of human rights"], Annales de l’Université de Lomé, series Lettres et sciences humaines, no. XXIV, 2004, pp. 81–95, ISSN 1016-9202.
- "Éthique et antinomie de l’ordre démocratique dans le rationalisme critique de Karl Popper" ["Ethics and the antinomy of democratic order in Karl Popper's critical rationalism"], Mosaïque, Revue interafricaine de philosophie et des sciences humaines, Don Bosco, Lomé, nos. 005–006, 2006, pp. 29–42, ISSN 1812-8645.
- "État de droit et liberté dans la pensée politique de Kant" ["Rule of law and freedom in Kant's political thought"], Journal de la recherche scientifique de l’Université de Lomé, series Lettres et sciences humaines, vol. 9, no. 2, 2007, pp. 93–103, ISSN 1727-8651.
- "Hannah Arendt et la pax Romana : du politique à la guerre" ["Hannah Arendt and the Pax Romana: from politics to war"], Repère, Revue scientifique de l’Université de Bouaké, vol. 1, no. 1, 2008, pp. 143–158, ISSN 1817-177X.
- "Les conditions éthiques de possibilité de la modernité politique en Afrique" ["The ethical conditions of possibility for political modernity in Africa"], Annales de l’Université de Ouagadougou, no. 007, 2008, pp. 439–462, ISSN 0796-5842.
- "Le rôle de la paix pour le progrès de la raison chez Spinoza" ["The role of peace in the progress of reason in Spinoza"], Particip’Action, Revue internationale de philosophie, Université de Lomé, vol. 1, 2009, pp. 316–335, ISSN 2071-1964.
- "La paix : éthique et politique" ["Peace: ethics and politics"], Particip’Action, Revue interafricaine de littérature, linguistique et philosophie, Université de Lomé, vol. 2, no. 2, July 2010, pp. 319–328, ISSN 2071-1964.
- "Paix de l’âme et paix civile dans le De rerum natura de Lucrèce" ["Peace of the soul and civil peace in Lucretius's De rerum natura"], Annales de l’Université de Lomé, series Lettres et sciences humaines, tome XXX-1, 2010, pp. 67–70, ISSN 1016-9209.
- "Le problème des pactes à l’époque de l’égoïsme métaphysique : réflexion sur la paix selon Schopenhauer" ["The problem of pacts in the age of metaphysical egoism: a reflection on peace according to Schopenhauer"], Mosaïque, Revue interafricaine de philosophie, littérature et sciences humaines, Don Bosco, Lomé, no. 010, December 2010, pp. 299–306, ISSN 1812-8645.
- "Paix civile et équité dans la philosophie politique de Thomas Hobbes" ["Civil peace and equity in the political philosophy of Thomas Hobbes"], Revue scientifique de l’Université de Bouaké, vol. 1, 2011, pp. 253–272, ISSN 1817-177X.
- "Pluralisme et interculturalité comme condition d’une tolérance critique et d’une éthique de la paix" ["Pluralism and interculturality as conditions for critical tolerance and an ethics of peace"], Le Cahier philosophique d’Afrique, Revue internationale de philosophie, Université de Ouagadougou, no. 11, 2013, pp. 53–66, ISSN 0796-5842.
- "Angoisse et l’ombre de la paix" ["Anxiety and the shadow of peace"], Particip’Action, Revue interafricaine de littérature, linguistique et philosophie, Université de Lomé, vol. 5, no. 1, January 2013, pp. 333–343, ISSN 2071-1964.
