= Ayawovi Demba Tignokpa =

Togolese politician

Ayawovi Demba Tignokpa is a Togolese politician. She served as Minister of Finance from 2002 to 2003, and Minister for Development Planning and Cooperation from January 2019 to October 2020.

== Life ==
Ayawovi Demba Tignokpa was Minister of the Economy, Finance and Privatisations from 2002 to 2003. She was the first woman to be Minister of Finance in Togo.

Demba Tignokpa was one of three deputies, and two Union for the Republic deputies, elected from Bassar Prefecture in the 2013 parliamentary election.

In 2015 Tignokpa was a founding member of the African Parliamentarians' Network on Development Evaluation (APNODE).

In 2017 Tignokpa was serving as Chairperson of Togo's Public Accounts Committee (Togo PAC), and as President of the West African Association of Public Accounts Committees (WAAPAC).

Demba Tignokpa was brought into the cabinet of Prime Minister Komi Sélom Klassou in a reshuffle announced on 25 January 2019. She replaced Kossi Assimaidou as Minister for Planning and Development, with an expanded portfolio including cooperation. In February 2019 she was appointed 3-year President of the Country Coordination Mechanism for funds financed by the Global Fund for fighting HIV/AIDS, tuberculosis and malaria in Togo. She lost her ministerial position in Victoire Tomégah-Dogbe's cabinet of October 2020, in which the Ministry of Planning and Cooperation was attached to the Presidency of the Republic.
