= Pascal Bodjona =

Togolese politician

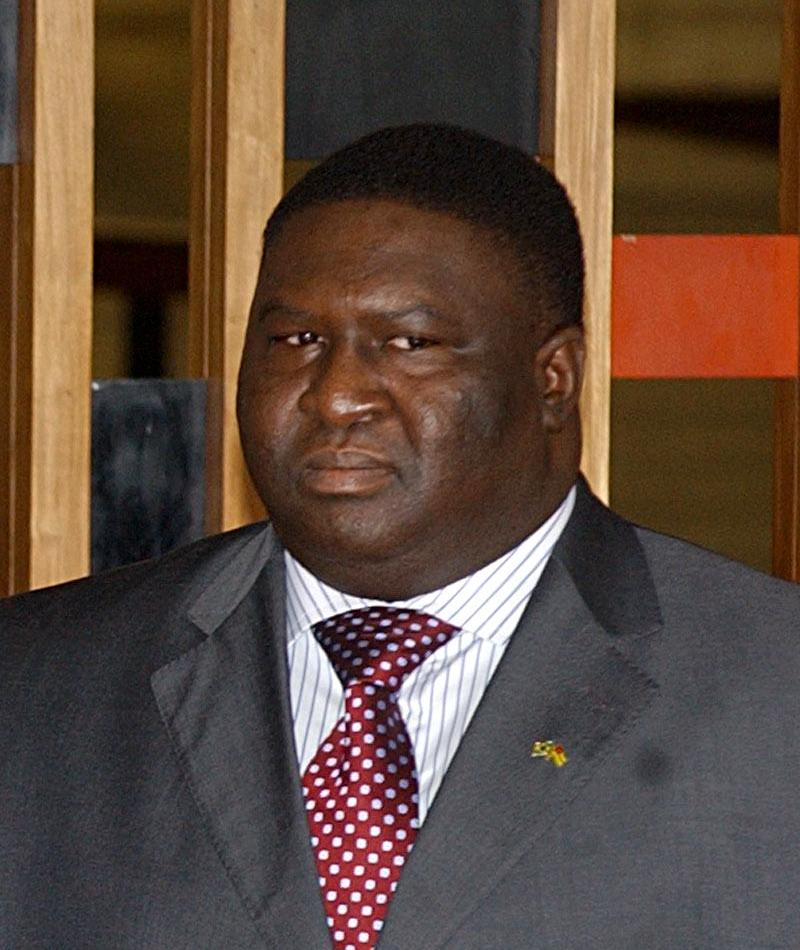
- Pascal Bodjona

Minister of State for Territorial Administration, Decentralization and Local Collectivities
- In office 13 December 2007 – 2012
- President: Faure Gnassingbé

Ambassador of Togo to the United States
- In office 1998–2005
- President: Gnassingbé Eyadéma

Director of the Presidential Cabinet
- In office 2005–2007
- President: Faure Gnassingbé

Personal details
- Born: May 17, 1966 (age 60) Kétao, Binah Prefecture, Togo
- Party: Rally of the Togolese People (RPT)
- Education: Harvard Kennedy School
- Occupation: Politician, diplomat

Pascal Akoussoulèlou Bodjona (born 17 May 1966) is a Togolese politician who served in the government of Togo as Minister of State for Territorial Administration, Decentralization, and Local Collectivities, as well as Government Spokesman, from 2007 to 2012. Previously he was Ambassador to the United States from 1998 to 2005 and Director of the Presidential Cabinet from 2005 to 2007.

== Early life and diplomatic career ==
Bodjona was born in Kétao, located in Binah Prefecture. After attending school in Kétao and Lomé, the capital, he went to the United States to study at the John F. Kennedy School of Government at Harvard University. He was appointed as Special Adviser to the Ministry of Foreign Affairs and Cooperation in 1994 before being appointed to the Embassy of Togo to the United States in 1995 as an attaché. Subsequently, he was promoted to the post of Ambassador to the United States in January 1998. That appointment was criticized by some opponents of the government, who alleged that Bodjona had previously been involved in political violence. Bodjona presented his credentials as Ambassador to US President Bill Clinton on 27 May 1998; he also served concurrently as Ambassador to Brazil. Bodjona remained in his diplomatic post for seven years, becoming the Dean of the West African Diplomatic Corps in Washington DC.

== 2005 presidential campaign and government service ==
In January 2005, Bodjona returned to Togo to participate in celebrations marking the anniversary of the 13 January 1967 coup that brought President Gnassingbé Eyadéma to power. Eyadéma then died suddenly on 5 February 2005, and as a result Bodjona did not return to the US to continue his work as ambassador. He instead served as the spokesman of Eyadema's son Faure Gnassingbé, who was the Rally of the Togolese People (RPT) candidate in the April 2005 presidential election. As candidate spokesman, he condemned the violence that surrounded the election and rejected opposition accusations that the RPT engaged in electoral fraud and misconduct.

After Gnassingbé's victory, Bodjona was appointed as Director of the Cabinet of President of the Republic in May 2005. He remained in that post for over two and a half years. Following the October 2007 parliamentary election, Bodjona was appointed as Minister of State for Territorial Administration, Decentralization, and Local Collectivities, as well as Government Spokesman, on 13 December 2007.

The Togolese football team was ambushed and attacked by rebels in Angola in January 2010, and consequently the team withdrew from the African Cup of Nations to observe a period of mourning. The Confederation of African Football (CAF) then banned the team from playing in the next two tournaments and fined it $50,000. Speaking for the government after CAF's decision, Bodjona expressed outrage, saying that CAF had "no consideration for the lives of other human beings" and that the decision was "insulting to the family of those who lost their lives and those traumatised because of the attack." He also said that the government would take legal action.

== Activities in the RPT ==
Bodjona is a member of the RPT Political Bureau and is the RPT's National Secretary for Political Affairs.

== See also ==
- Victoire Tomegah Dogbé
