= Konfesse =

- Location in Togo
- Coordinates: 9°48′N 1°15′E
- Country: Togo
- Region: Kara Region
- Prefecture: Bimah
- Time zone: UTC + 0

Konfesse is a village in the Bimah Prefecture in the Kara Region of north-eastern Togo.
