= Boufale =

- Location in Togo
- Coordinates: 9°51′49″N 1°19′54″E
- Country: Togo
- Region: Kara Region
- Prefecture: Bimah
- Time zone: UTC + 0

Boufale is a village in the Bimah Prefecture in the Kara Region of north-eastern Togo.
