= Minister of Finance (Togo) =

List of ministers of the Ministry of Finance of Togo

This is a list of finance ministers of Togo.

- Hospice Coco, 1958–1963
- Antoine Meatchi, 1963–1966
- Boukari Djobo, 1966
- Benoit Bedou, 1966–1967
- Boukari Djobo, 1967–1969
- Jean Têvi, 1969–1973
- Edem Kodjo, 1973–1977
- Yao Grunitzky, 1977–1978
- Tété Têvi Benissan, 1978–1984
- Komlan Alipui, 1984–1988
- Yaovi Adodo, 1988–1990
- Komlan Alipui, 1990–1991
- Elias Kwassivi Kpetigo, 1991–1993
- Franck Fianyo, 1993–1994
- Elom Emile Dadzie, 1994–1996
- Barry Moussa Barque, 1996–1999
- Abdoul-Hamid Segoun Tidjani Dourodjaye, 1999–2000
- Tankpadja Lalle, 2000–2002
- Kossi Assimaidou, 2002
- Ayawovi Demba Tignokpa, 2002–2003
- Débaba Bale, 2003–2005
- Payadowa Boukpessi, 2005–2007
- Adji Otèth Ayassor, 2007–2016
- Sani Yaya, 2016–2024
- Essowè Georges Barcola, 2024-present
