= Barry Moussa Barqué =

Togolese politician (born 1942)

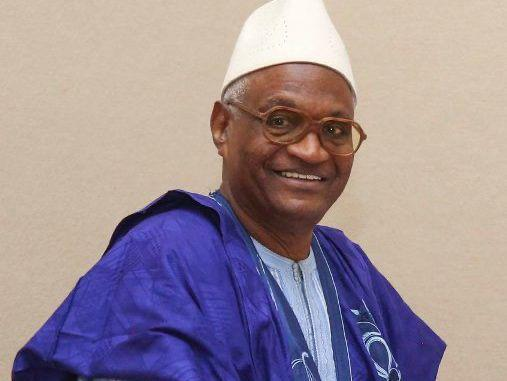
Barry Moussa Barqué as Senate President

Barry Moussa Barqué (born 17 November 1942) is a Togolese politician who served in the government of Togo under President Gnassingbé Eyadéma for most of the period from 1979 to 1999. He was elected President of the Senate on 2 April 2025.

== Life and career ==
Barqué was born on 17 November 1942 in Dapaong. He is a Fulani from northern Togo. He served as Director of the Autonomous Port of Lomé during the 1970s and was appointed to the government as Minister of Mines, Energy, and Water Resources on March 19, 1979. He was Minister of Equipment, Mines, Posts and Telecommunications in the early 1980s. Considered a devoted loyalist of Eyadéma, he served in many positions in the government over the following 20 years, becoming a powerful "baron" of the ruling party, the Rally of the Togolese People (RPT). At the time of the March 1985 parliamentary election, he was President of the National Commission of General Census of Votes and Verification.

Barqué was Special Adviser to the President of the Republic for a time before being appointed Minister of State for Foreign Affairs and Cooperation on November 29, 1995; he held the latter position until 1996. He subsequently became Minister of State for Finance and Privatization in 1996 until departing from the government in June 1999; he was instead appointed a Special Advisor to the President at that time.

He was stabbed several times by his nephew Altine Barry on the night of October 24–25, 2003, and was flown to Paris for medical treatment. On March 5, 2007, Altine Barry was sentenced to 20 years in prison for this attack.

Following the death of President Eyadéma on February 5, 2005, Barqué expressed shock, saying that he had seemed healthy immediately beforehand. Eyadéma's son Fauré Gnassingbé succeeded him as president, but this succession was widely deemed unconstitutional. Barqué was included as part of a Togolese delegation that travelled to Niamey on February 12 in an attempt to explain and defend Gnassingbé's succession to the Economic Community of West African States (ECOWAS), which had reacted to it with hostility.

Barqué is a member of the RPT Central Committee; he was elected as a Central Committee member from Tône Prefecture at the RPT's 9th Congress in December 2006. He also serves as a member of the RPT College of Sages.

On 7 September 2007, Barqué presided over the ceremony at which the 162 candidates of the ruling RPT for the October 2007 parliamentary election were invested.

Under Faure Gnassingbé, Barqué remains a Special Adviser to the President with the rank of Minister as of January 2009. Rumors circulated in January 2015 regarding a purported dispute between Barqué and Gnassingbé. In March 2025 Barqué was elected to the Senate of Togo for Tône Prefecture on behalf of the Union for the Republic (UNIR). He was elected President of the Senate on 2 April 2025.
