= Probe =

Probe may refer to:

== Films ==
- Probe (film), American TV film that served as the pilot for the TV series Search
- P.R.O.B.E., a series of direct-to-video Doctor Who spinoffs starring Caroline John

== Television ==
- Probe (1988 TV series), American TV series created by William Link and Isaac Asimov
- Probe (Philippine TV program), a defunct Philippine public-affairs show
- "The Probe" (Beast Wars), an episode
- "The Probe", the final episode of the original The Outer Limits

== Other entertainment ==
- Probe (parlor game), a parlor game introduced in the 1960s by Parker Brothers
- "Probe", a 2002 hit single by DJ Baby Anne
- One of characters from the BoBoiBoy franchise

== Other uses ==
- Ford Probe, coupe produced by Ford, introduced in 1989
- Probe Records (shop), an independent record shop in Liverpool, England
- Space probe, uncrewed spacecraft
- Molecular probe, a group of atoms or molecules used to study other molecules
- Hybridization probe, a labeled fragment of DNA or RNA,
- Test probe (electronics), a physical device used to connect electronic test equipment to a device under test
- Probe is a newspaper headline name for various kinds of Investigation (disambiguation)
  - A criminal investigation
  - A Congressional investigation

== See also ==
- Sonde (disambiguation), French for probe
