= Yaovi Adodo =

Togolese diplomat and politician

Yaovi Prosper Adodo (born 12 June 1942) is a former Togolese diplomat and politician. Adodo was the Minister of Foreign Affairs from 1987 to 1991 under President Gnassingbé Eyadéma. Additionally he served as Minister of Finance from 1988 to 1990. He was previously Minister of Planning and Industry, in which capacity he signed the Third ACP-EEC Convention in Lomé on 8 December 1984.

Adodo was appointed one of six members of the Commission of the West African Economic and Monetary Union (UEMOA) on 30 January 1995.

Preceded by Atsu Koffi Amega	Foreign Minister of Togo; 1987–1991	Succeeded by Aboudou Tchiaka
