= Sirka, Togo =

- Location in Togo
- Coordinates: 9°34′19″N 1°19′6″E
- Country: Togo
- Region: Kara Region
- Prefecture: Bimah
- Time zone: UTC + 0

Sirka is a small town in the Bimah Prefecture of Kara Region of Togo. It is located 76 kilometres from Kara. It had a population of around 5,528 in 2010.
