= Minister of Foreign Affairs (Togo) =

The Minister of Foreign Affairs of Togo is a government minister in charge of the Ministry of Foreign Affairs of Togo, responsible for conducting foreign relations of the country.

The following is a list of foreign ministers of Togo since its founding in 1960:

- 1960–1963: Paulin Freitas
- 1963–1967: Georges Apedo-Amah
- 1967–1976: Joachim Hunlede
- 1976–1978: Edem Kodjo
- 1978–1984: Anani Akakpo Ahianyo
- 1984–1987: Atsu Koffi Amega
- 1987–1991: Yaovi Adodo
- 1991–1992: Abdou Touré Tchiaka
- 1992–1994: Fambaré Ouattara Natchaba
- 1994–1995: Boumbéra Alassounouma
- 1995............ Yandja Yentchabre (acting)
- 1995–1996: Barry Moussa Barqué
- 1996–1998: Koffi Panou
- 1998–2000: Joseph Kokou Koffigoh
- 2000–2002: Koffi Panou
- 2002–2003: Roland Kpotsra
- 2003–2005: Kokou Tozoun
- 2005–2007: Zarifou Ayéva
- 2007–2008: Léopold Gnininvi
- 2008–2010: Kofi Esaw
- 2010–2013: Elliott Ohin
- 2013–present: Robert Dussey
