= Farende =

- Location in Togo
- Coordinates: 9°44′N 1°15′E
- Country: Togo
- Region: Kara Region
- Prefecture: Bimah
- Time zone: UTC + 0

Farende is a village in the Bimah Prefecture in the Kara Region of north-eastern Togo. Charles Piot, of Duke University, has written books on Farende and its neighboring villages.
