= Paulin Freitas =

Togolese politician, diplomat (1909–1989)

Paulin Freitas (December 3, 1909 – May 17, 1989) was a Togolese politician and diplomat. Freitas was the first foreign minister of Togo from independence on 27 April 1960 until a military coup d'etat on 13 January 1963 which led to the overthrow and execution of then President Sylvanus Olympio.

Preceded by position created	Foreign Minister of Togo; 1960-1963	Succeeded by Georges Apedo-Amah
