= Pagouda =

- Location in Togo
- Coordinates: 9°45′N 1°19′E
- Country: Togo
- Region: Kara Region

Population (2004)
  - Total: 13,200

Pagouda is a city in Togo with 13,200 inhabitants (2004), near the border of Benin. It is the seat of Binah prefecture in Kara Region.

== Climate ==
Climate data for Pagouda (1991-2020)
Month	Jan	Feb	Mar	Apr	May	Jun	Jul	Aug	Sep	Oct	Nov	Dec	Year
Average precipitation mm (inches)	2.6 (0.10)	9.9 (0.39)	32.4 (1.28)	74.8 (2.94)	133.7 (5.26)	181.1 (7.13)	251.8 (9.91)	263.4 (10.37)	252.0 (9.92)	119.2 (4.69)	13.3 (0.52)	0.4 (0.02)	1,334.6 (52.54)
Average precipitation days (≥ 1 mm)	0.2	0.8	2.6	7.0	10.8	12.2	17.4	18.0	18.5	10.7	1.6	0.1	99.9
Source: NOAA
