= Kawa, Togo =

- Location in Togo
- Coordinates: 9°44′N 1°18′E
- Country: Togo
- Region: Kara Region
- Prefecture: Bimah
- Elevation: 1,499 ft (457 m)
- Time zone: UTC + 0

Kawa, Togo is a village in the Bimah Prefecture in the Kara Region of north-eastern Togo.
