= Solla =

- Location in Togo
- Coordinates: 9°53′26″N 1°20′56″E
- Country: Togo
- Region: Kara Region
- Prefecture: Bimah
- Time zone: UTC + 0

Solla is a village in the Binah Prefecture in the Kara Region of north-eastern Togo. The Miyobe language is spoken in Solla.
