= Kadianga =

- Location in Togo
- Coordinates: 9°42′N 1°20′E
- Country: Togo
- Region: Kara Region
- Prefecture: Bimah
- Time zone: UTC + 0

Kadianga is a village in the Bimah Prefecture in the Kara Region of north-eastern Togo.
