= Sonde, Togo =

- Location in Togo
- Coordinates: 9°46′N 1°16′E
- Country: Togo
- Region: Kara Region
- Prefecture: Bimah
- Time zone: UTC + 0

Sonde, Togo is a village in the Bimah Prefecture in the Kara Region of north-eastern Togo.
