= Roland Kpotsra =

Togolese diplomat and politician

Yao Roland Kpotsra (February 20, 1947 – October 10, 2018) was a Togolese diplomat and politician. He was Togo's Permanent Representative to the United Nations from 1996 to 2002 and again from 2007 to 2009; he was also Minister of Foreign Affairs from 2002 to 2003.

== Diplomatic and political career ==
Kpotsra was born in Lomé and died on 11 October 2018. He began working at the Ministry of Foreign Affairs in 1974 at its Administrative Affairs Division. From September 1976 to February 1979, he was Secretary at Togo's Permanent Mission to the United Nations; he was then Counsellor at the Permanent Mission from February 1979 to April 1980 and Chargé d'affaires at the Permanent Mission from April 1980 to August 1980. He was First Counsellor at the Togolese Embassy to Brazil from September 1980 to May 1982.

At the Foreign Ministry, Kpotsra was Director of the Treaties and Legal Affairs Division from July 23, 1982 to January 5, 1988, as well as Director of Administration and Personnel from October 9, 1987 to August 1990. From 8 September 1990 to 30 June 1991, he was Chargé d'affaires in Zimbabwe; he was then Chargé de mission of the Foreign Ministry from September 1992 to March 23, 1993. From March 1993 to 1996, he was Secretary-General of the Foreign Ministry. During this time, he headed the Togolese delegation to the Twelfth Ministerial Conference of the Non-Aligned Movement on April 25–27, 1995 in Bandung, Indonesia, as well as the Togolese delegation to the sixty-third regular session of the Organization of African Unity's Council of Ministers, held on February 26–28, 1996 in Addis Ababa.

Kpotsra was appointed Permanent Representative to the UN for the first time in 1996, presenting his credentials on December 11, 1996; he remained Permanent Representative until December 2002. Kpotsra was named Minister of Foreign Affairs and Cooperation on December 3, 2002, serving in that position until he was appointed Minister of the Promotion of Democracy and the Rule of Law in the government named on July 29, 2003. He remained in the latter position until he was dismissed from the government that was named on June 20, 2005. President Faure Gnassingbé then appointed Kpotsra as Diplomatic Adviser at the Presidency of the Republic on July 26, 2005. He held that post until 2007, when he was appointed Togo's Permanent Representative to the UN again; he presented his credentials to UN Secretary-General Ban Ki-moon on October 1, 2007.

Kpotsra was recalled to Lomé in early 2009, and Kodjo Menan was appointed to replace him on 3 April 2009.

== Honors ==
Kpotsra was awarded the Chevalier of the National Order of Merit in April 1984 and was made an Officer of the Order of Mono in March 1996.
