= Ketao =

Kétao
- Location in Togo
- Coordinates: 9°39′40″N 1°18′41″E
- Country: Togo
- Region: Kara Region
- Prefecture: Binah
- Time zone: UTC + 0

Ketao is a town in the Bimah Prefecture in the Kara Region of north-eastern Togo.
