= Sonda =

Sonda can refer to:

- Sonda (rocket), a type of Brazilian-built sounding rocket
- Sonda (TV series), a Polish television popular science series broadcast between 1977 and 1989
- Sonda, Estonia, a settlement in Estonia
- Sonda, Karnataka, India
- Sonda, Nadia, a census town in West Bengal, India
- Sonda S.A., a Chilean company

As an acronym, SONDA can refer to:

- the Sexual Orientation Non-Discrimination Act, a law in New York State passed in 2002
