= Filter fluorometer =

Type of fluorometer in fluorescence spectroscopy

A filter fluorometer is a type of fluorometer that may be employed in fluorescence spectroscopy.

In the fluorometer, a light source emits light of an excitation wavelength that is relevant to the compound to be measured. Filter fluorometers produce specific excitation and emission wavelengths by using optical filters. The filter blocks other wavelengths but transmits wavelengths relevant to the compound. The light passes through the sample to be measured, and a certain wavelength is absorbed while a longer wavelength is emitted. The emitted light is measured by a detector. By changing the optical filter, different substances can be measured.

== Applications ==
Filter fluorometers can be highly sensitive, so are well suited to precise scientific research. The optical filters are relatively inexpensive and are easy to change, so filter fluorometers are commonly used in experimental applications which repeatedly measure different compounds.

== Filters ==
There are two filters for the fluorometer:

1. The primary filter or excitation filter or incident light filter isolates the wavelength that will cause the compound to fluoresce (the incident light).
2. The secondary filter isolates the desired emitted light (fluorescent light).

=== Choosing the correct filters ===
The proper selection of filters requires familiarity with the emission spectrum and the excitation spectrum. The primary filter is selected to transmit only the wavelengths from the emission spectrum and excitation spectrum that overlap.
