= Charles Kondi Agba =

Togolese politician (1948–2022)

Charles Kondi Agba (born 26 August 1948 died 13 July 2022) is a Togolese politician who served in the government of Togo from 1999 to 2008. He again served in the government as Minister of Health from 2011 to 2013.

Agba (DVM) graduated with a veterinary medicine diploma from the EISMV Veterinary School of Dakar Sénégal. He quickly became an Anatomist Professor's reference in several countries like Sénégal, Cameroun, Togo, France and Tunisia. He was considered an "African veterinary anatomy bible reference" and a mentor by medical researchers, professors, students, and other professionals in the field.

== Life and career ==
Agba was born in Kabou, located in Bassar Prefecture, and studied to become a veterinary doctor. He was considerate like one of the Famous Anatomist professor specially in Veterinary Anatomy Science. Charles Kondi Agba has taught in Sénégal (Eismv Veterinary School), in Cameroun, Togo, Tunisia (Tunisie), and France (in the France ENV Schools).

Charles Kondi Agba was a mentor in veterinary medicine Sciences. He was considered a model to follow in his community.

From 1990 to 1999, he was the Togolese ambassador to Senegal, Cape Verde, France, and the Order of Malta, as well as Permanent Representative to UNESCO and the Food and Agriculture Organization. He was then appointed to the government as Minister of Health in June 1999. He was moved to the post of Minister of Agriculture and Research on 5 July 2002, then to the post of Minister of Higher Education and Research on 29 July 2003. As of 2004, he was also President of the Togolese National Commission for UNESCO. On 20 June 2005, he was promoted to the position of Minister of State for Agriculture, Animal Husbandry, and Fishing; he was instead appointed as Minister of State for Health on 20 September 2006.

In the October 2007 parliamentary election, Agba was the first candidate on the candidate list of the Rally of the Togolese People (RPT) in Lomé, the capital. He won the last of the five available seats, becoming the only RPT candidate to be elected in Lomé; he remained in the government that was formed after the election, however, and continued to serve as Minister of State for Health until 15 September 2008, when he was dismissed from the government.

Agba was again appointed to the government as Minister of Health in June 2011, succeeding Komlan Mally. He remained in that post until he was dismissed from the government on 17 September 2013.
