= Soundings (Carter) =

Composition by Elliott Carter

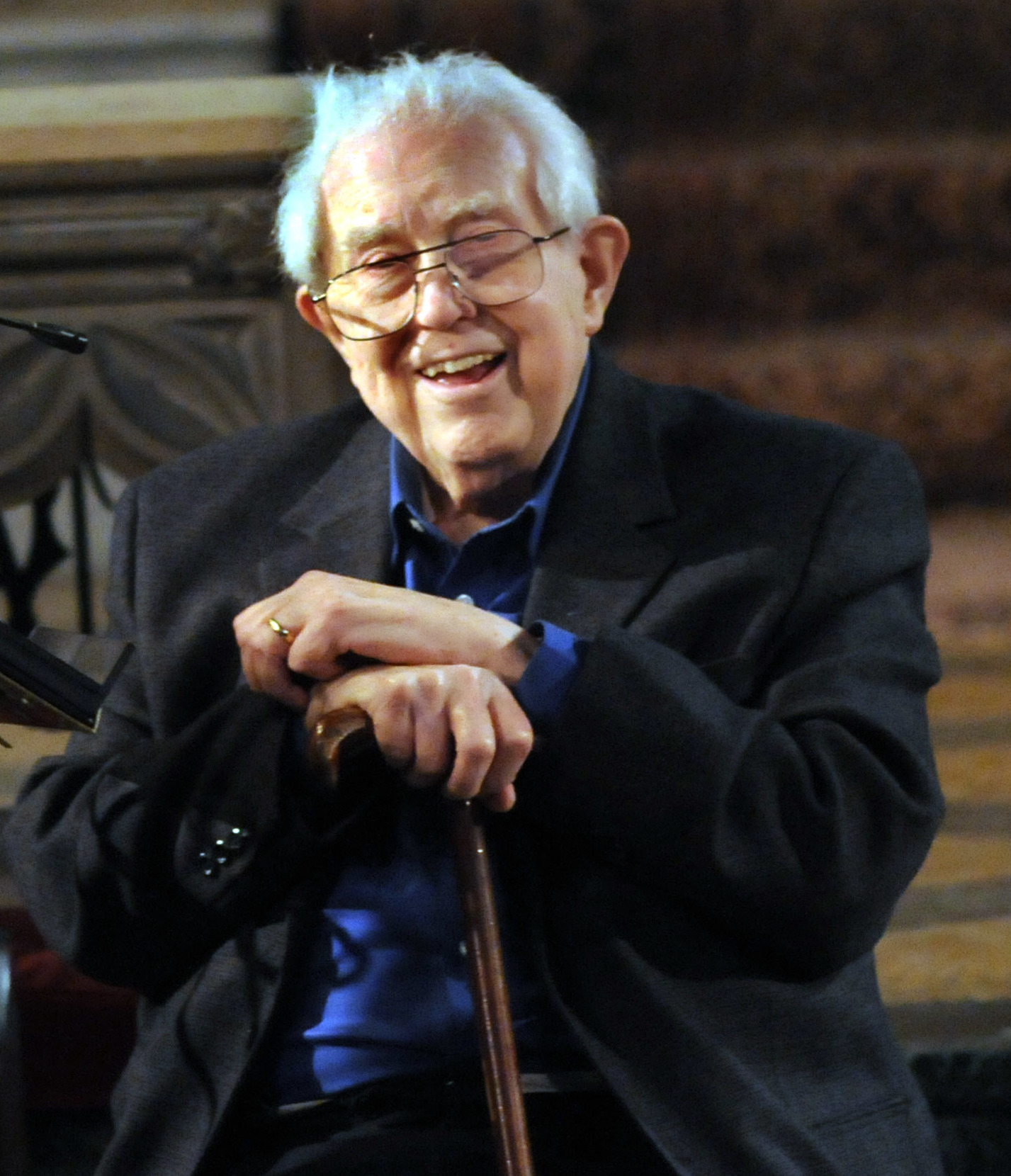
Elliott Carter in 2007

Soundings is an orchestral composition by the American composer Elliott Carter. The work was commissioned by the Chicago Symphony Orchestra for their final season with the conductor Daniel Barenboim as music director. It was first performed on October 6, 2005, at the Symphony Center, Chicago, by Barenboim and the Chicago Symphony Orchestra.

== Composition ==
Soundings has a duration of roughly ten minutes and is composed in one continuous movement. Carter wrote in the score program note, "Soundings celebrates the conductor/pianist Daniel Barenboim, whose Chicago Symphony Orchestra commissioned this score which was written in New York City in 2005. It presents a 'soundings' of the conductor/pianist and of many instrumental groups or soloists within the orchestra and presents them with good humor."

The work is scored for an orchestra comprising piccolo, two flutes (doubling piccolo), two oboes, cor anglais, two clarinets (first doubling E♭ clarinet, second doubling bass clarinet), contrabass clarinet, two bassoons, contrabassoon, four horns, three trumpets, three trombones, tuba, timpani, two percussionists, piano, and strings.

== Reception ==
Reviewing the world premiere, John von Rhein of the Chicago Tribune lauded the composition, writing:

Soundings packs a lot of invention into its dozen minutes. Carter celebrates the two Barenboims, giving him music to play at the piano and a lot more music to conduct, but never at the same time. The odd thing is why Barenboim the pianist is given so very little to do. The piano starts things off with a cadenza-like flourish containing Barenboim's musical monogram, reappearing at the end in a sly game of starts and stops between the keyboard and orchestra. In between, Carter gives us a parade of rapidly shifting orchestral ideas: horn and woodwinds chopping up a darting phrase; the subterranean rumbles of contrabass clarinet; a twittering trio of piccolos; a pensive tuba solo that's actually longer than the entire piano part. Through it all, there's Carter the high-modernist artisan, delighting in the virtuosic sinew of a great orchestra he knows well.

Andrew Clements of The Guardian gave the work a more mixed response, however, observing, "Composed three years ago as a leaving present for Daniel Barenboim when he stepped down as music director of the Chicago Symphony, Soundings was expressly designed for Barenboim to conduct from the piano like a Mozart concerto. For that reason, it is an odd piece, with little dialogue between the piano and the large orchestra." He added, "The main body of the piece is a miniature concerto for the orchestra alone, with some typically nimble late Carter ideas - for a choir of clarinets and a trio of piccolos, especially - but the whole thing never really hangs together."
