= Bimah Prefecture =

Coordinates: 9°45′N 1°19′E

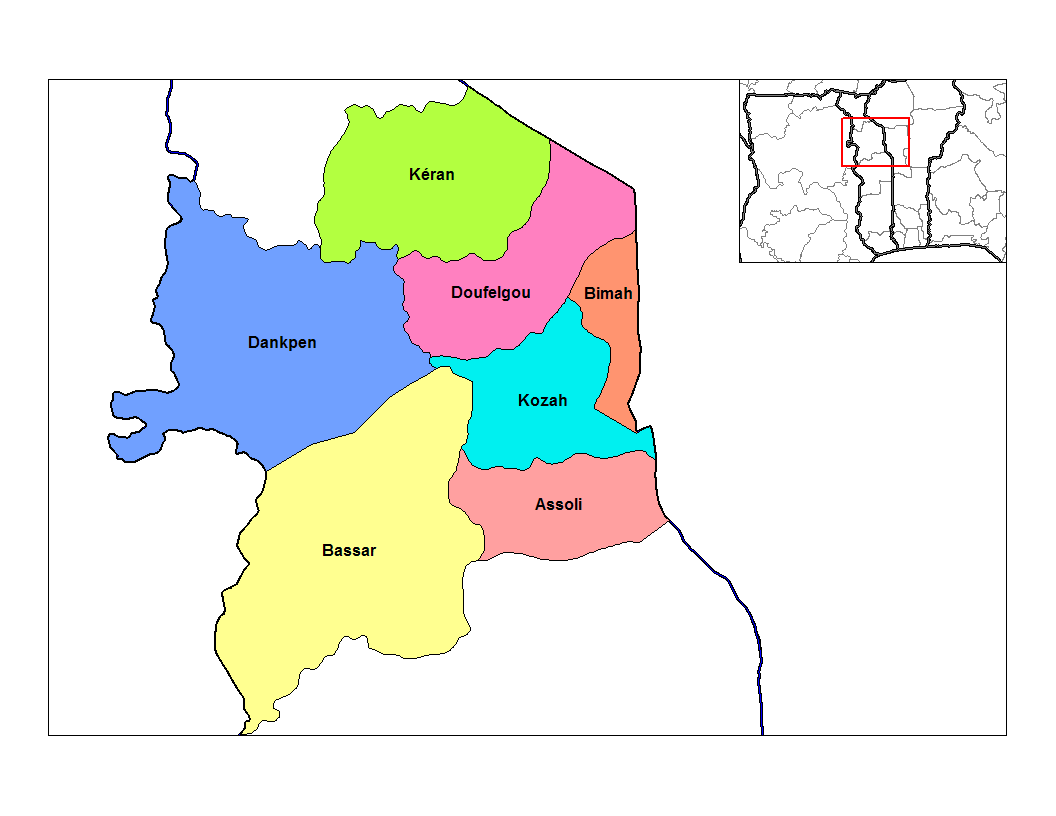
Prefectures of Kara

Bimah is a prefecture located in the Kara Region of Togo. At the time of the 2022 census it had a population of 84,199 people. The prefecture seat is located in Pagouda.

The cantons (or subdivisions) of Binah include Pagouda, Kétao, Pessaré, Lama-Dessi, Boufalé, Solla, Sirka, Kémérida, and Pitikita.

== Towns and villages ==
The following is a list of towns and villages in Bimah Prefecture.

- Alemande
- Aloumboukou
- Assire
- Boufale
- Dewa
- Farende
- Kadianga
- Kagnissi
- Kawa
- Kemerida
- Ketao
- Koloum
- Konfesse
- Koudja
- Koukoude
- Pagouda
- Pessere
- Siou Kawa
- Sirka
- Sola
- Solla
- Sonde
- Tereouda
- Tialaide
- Tikarè
- N'Djeï
