= Sondes =

Sondes is a surname. Notable people with the surname include:

- Baron Sondes
  - Earl Sondes
    - George Milles, 1st Earl Sondes (1824–1894)
- Viscount Sondes
- George Sondes, 1st Earl of Feversham (1599–1677)
- Sir Michael Sondes, MP (died 1617) of Throwley, Kent
