= Kofi Esaw =

Togolese politician and diplomat

Minister of Justice of Togo
- Incumbent
- Assumed office 17 September 2013
- President: Faure Gnassingbé

Minister of Foreign Affairs and Regional Cooperation of Togo
- In office 15 September 2008 – 2010
- Prime Minister: Gilbert Houngbo

Ambassador of Togo to Ethiopia
- In office 29 September 2004 – 2008

Personal details
- Occupation: Politician, diplomat

Kofi Esaw is a Togolese politician and diplomat who has served in the government of Togo as Minister of Justice since 2013. He was Minister of Foreign Affairs from 2008 to 2010 and subsequently served as diplomatic adviser to President Faure Gnassingbé.

== Career ==
Esaw was appointed Minister of Foreign Affairs and Regional Cooperation on 15 September 2008 as part of the government headed by Prime Minister Gilbert Houngbo. He had previously been the Ambassador of Togo to Ethiopia for four years, beginning on 29 September 2004; while serving as Ambassador to Ethiopia, he was also Togo's Ambassador to the African Union, which is headquartered in Addis Ababa, Ethiopia.

Esaw was appointed Ambassador to Ethiopia in early August 2004. During the diplomatic crisis that followed the death of Togolese President Gnassingbé Eyadéma in February 2005, Esaw defended the succession of Eyadema's son, Faure Gnassingbé, at a meeting of the African Union. According to Esaw, the father-son succession, which was widely deemed unconstitutional, was necessary because Togo faced "a very dangerous situation", saying that "there was the prospect of unrest and the only way to avoid the unrest was to take the action we did." The African Union's disapproval of the succession led to its decision to suspend Togo from the organization at the same meeting; Esaw was asked to leave the meeting following the suspension.

Esaw was appointed Minister of Justice and Relations with the Institutions of the Republic on 17 September 2013.
