= Spectrofluorometer =

Instrument for measuring chemical composition

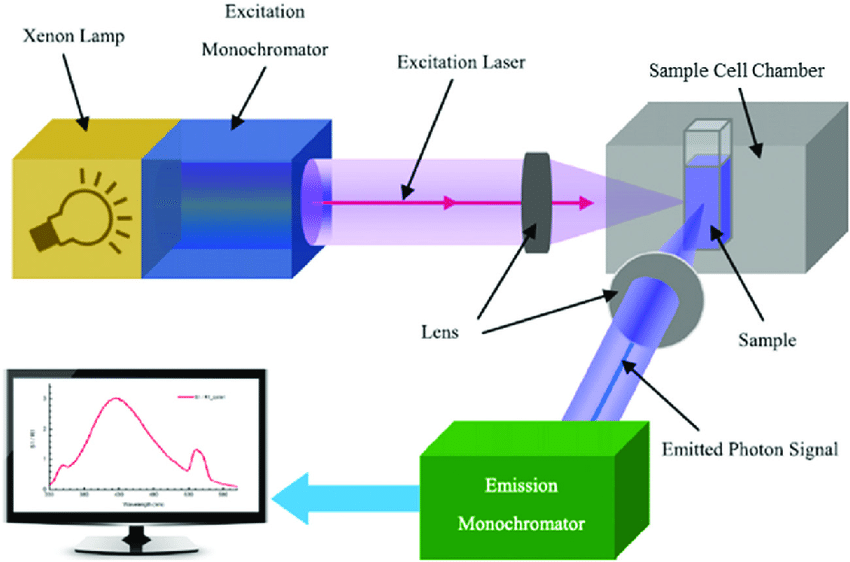
Schematic diagram of the arrangement of optical components in a typical Spectrofluorometer

A spectrofluorometer is an instrument which takes advantage of fluorescent properties of some compounds in order to provide information regarding their concentration and chemical environment in a sample. A certain excitation wavelength is selected, and the emission is observed either at a single wavelength, or a scan is performed to record the intensity versus wavelength, also called an emission spectrum. The instrument is used in fluorescence spectroscopy.

== Operation ==
Generally, spectrofluorometers use high intensity light sources to bombard a sample with as many photons as possible. This allows for the maximum number of molecules to be in an excited state at any one point in time. The light is either passed through a filter, selecting a fixed wavelength, or a monochromator, which allows a wavelength of interest to be selected for use as the exciting light. The emission is collected at the perpendicular to the emitted light. The emission is also either passed through a filter or a monochromator before being detected by a photomultiplier tube, photodiode, or charge-coupled device detector. The signal can either be processed as digital or analog output.

Systems vary greatly and a number of considerations affect the choice. The first is the signal-to-noise ratio. There are many ways to look at the signal to noise of a given system but the accepted standard is by using the Raman signal of water. Sensitivity or detection limit is another specification to be considered, that is how little light can be measured. The standard would be fluorescein in NaOH, typical values for a high end instrument are in the femtomolar range.

== Auxiliary components ==
These systems come with many options, including:

- Polarizers
- Peltier temperature controllers
- Cryostats
- Cold Finger Dewars
- Pulsed lasers for lifetime measurements
- LEDs for lifetimes
- Filter holders
- Adjustable optics (very important)
- Solid sample holders
- Slide holders
- Integrating spheres
- Near-infrared detectors
- Bilateral slits
- Manual slits
- Computer controlled slits
- Fast switching monochromators
- Filter wheels
