= Fura =

Fura may refer to:

- Mount Fura (Mt Darwin) site of capital of Monomotapa kingdom in Zimbabwe
- Fura (food), Nigerian millet dough balls eaten with nono
- Fura (rapper), Indian rapper
- SEAT Fura supermini car produced by Spanish automaker SEAT, between 1981 and 1986, based on the Fiat 127
- La Fura dels Baus Spanish theatrical group founded in 1979 in Moià, Barcelona
- Fura-Pawa (or El Molo), a possibly extinct language belonging to the Cushitic branch of the Afro-Asiatic family
- Nigist Fura, a legendary Queen of Ethiopia

== Science ==
- Fura-2, an aminopolycarboxylic acid
- Fura-2-acetoxymethyl ester, membrane-permeable derivative of the ratiometric calcium indicator Fura-2

== Acronyms ==
- Puerto Rico Joint Forces of Rapid Action Spanish: Fuerzas Unidas de Rapida Acción (FURA)
- Frente Unido de Reforma Agraria (FURA) coalition of popular movements in Ecuador, formed in 1972 for land reform
