= Calcium imaging =

Scientific method

Calcium imaging is a microscopy technique to optically measure the calcium (Ca^{2+}) status of an isolated cell, tissue or medium. Calcium imaging takes advantage of calcium indicators, fluorescent molecules that respond to the binding of Ca^{2+} ions by fluorescence properties. Two main classes of calcium indicators exist: chemical indicators and genetically encoded calcium indicators (GECI). This technique has allowed studies of calcium signalling in a wide variety of cell types, and can be used to measure electrical activity in hundreds of neurons in cell culture, or in living animals during ongoing behavior.

== Chemical indicators ==
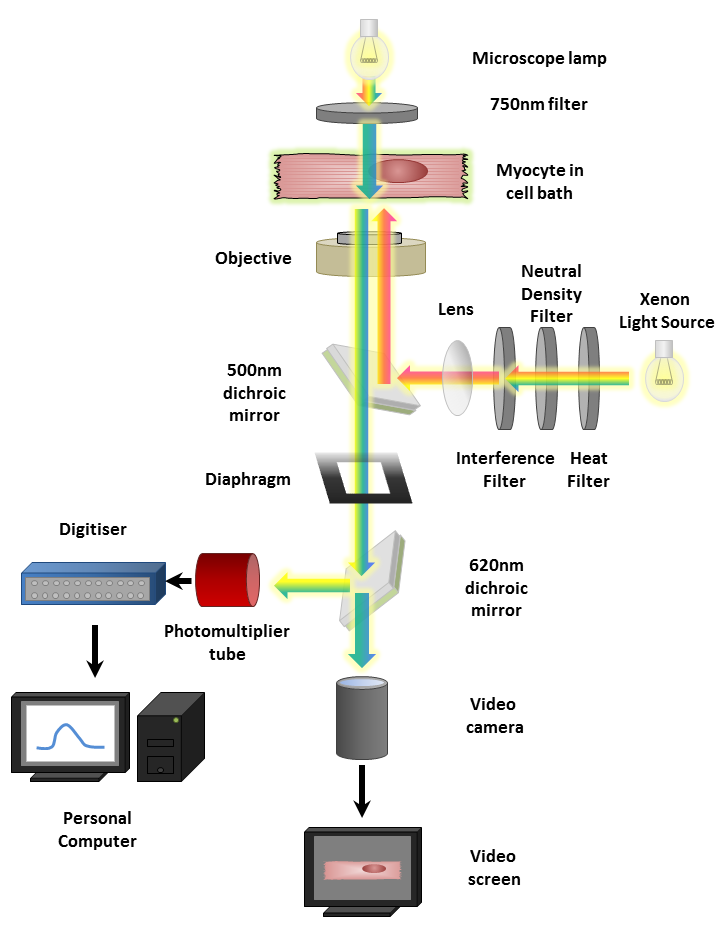
Schematic of a typical setup for calcium fluorescence imaging of isolated cardiac myocytes

Chemical indicators are small molecules that can chelate calcium ions. All these molecules are based on an EGTA homologue called BAPTA, with high selectivity for calcium (Ca^{2+}) ions versus magnesium (Mg^{2+}) ions.

This group of indicators includes fura-2, indo-1, fluo-3, fluo-4, Calcium Green-1.

These dyes are often used with the chelator carboxyl groups masked as acetoxymethyl esters, in order to render the molecule lipophilic and to allow easy entrance into the cell. Once this form of the indicator is in the cell, cellular esterases will free the carboxyl groups and the indicator will be able to bind calcium. The free acid form of the dyes (i.e. without the acetoxymethyl ester modification) can also be directly injected into cells via a microelectrode or micropipette which removes uncertainties as to the cellular compartment holding the dye (the acetoxymethyl ester can also enter the endoplasmic reticulum and mitochondria). Binding of a Ca^{2+} ion to a fluorescent indicator molecule leads to either an increase in quantum yield of fluorescence or emission/excitation wavelength shift. Individual chemical Ca^{2+} fluorescent indicators are utilized for cytosolic calcium measurements in a wide variety of cellular preparations. The first real time (video rate) Ca^{2+} imaging was carried out in 1986 in cardiac cells using intensified video cameras. Later development of the technique using laser scanning confocal microscopes revealed sub-cellular Ca^{2+} signals in the form of Ca^{2+} sparks and Ca^{2+} blips. Relative responses from a combination of chemical Ca^{2+} fluorescent indicators were also used to quantify calcium transients in intracellular organelles such as mitochondria.

Calcium imaging, also referred to as calcium mapping, is also used to perform research on myocardial tissue. Calcium mapping is a ubiquitous technique used on whole, isolated hearts such as mouse, rat, and rabbit species.

== Genetically encoded calcium indicators ==
Genetically encoded calcium indicators (GECIs) are powerful tools useful for in vivo imaging of cellular, developmental, and physiological processes. GECIs do not need to be acutely loaded into cells; instead the genes encoding for these proteins can be introduced into individual cells or cell lines by various transfection methods. It is also possible to create transgenic animals expressing the indicator in all cells or selectively in certain cellular subtypes. GECIs are used to study neurons, T-cells, cardiomyocytes, and other cell types. Some GECIs report calcium by direct emission of photons (luminescence), but most rely on fluorescent proteins as reporters, including the green fluorescent protein GFP and its variants (eGFP, YFP, CFP).

Of the fluorescent reporters, calcium indicator systems can be classified into single fluorescent protein (FP) systems, and paired fluorescent protein systems. Camgaroos were one of the first developed variants involving a single protein system. Camgaroos take advantage of calmodulin (CaM), a calcium binding protein. In these structures, CaM is inserted in the middle of yellow fluorescent protein (YFP) at Y145. Previous mutagenesis studies revealed that mutations at this position conferred pH stability while maintaining fluorescent properties, making Y145 an insertion point of interest. Additionally, the N and C termini of YFP are linked by a peptide linker (GGTGGS). When CaM binds to Ca2+, the effective pKa is lowered, allowing for chromophore deprotonation. This results in increased fluorescence upon calcium binding in an intensiometric fashion. Such detection is in contrast with ratiometric systems, in which there is a change in the absorbance/emission spectra as a result of Ca2+ binding. A later developed single-FP system, dubbed G-CaMP, also invokes circularly permuted GFP. One of the termini is fused with CaM, and the other termini is fused with M13 (the calmodulin binding domain of myosin light kinase) The protein is designed such that the termini are close in space, allowing for Ca2+ binding to cause conformational changes and chromophore modulation, allowing for increased fluorescence. G-CaMP and its refined variants have nanomolar binding affinities. A final single protein variant is the CatchER, which is generally considered to be a lower affinity indicator. Its calcium binding pocket is quite negative; binding of the cation helps to shield the large concentration of negative charge and allows for recovered fluorescence.

In contrast to these systems are paired fluorescent protein systems, which include the prototypical Cameleons. Cameleons consist of two different fluorescent proteins, CaM, M13, and a glycylglycine linker. In the absence of Ca2+, only the donor blue-shifted fluorescent protein will be fluorescent. However, a conformational change caused by calcium binding repositions the red-shifted fluorescent protein, allowing for FRET (Förster resonance energy transfer) to take place. Cameleon indicators produce a ratiometric signal (i.e. the measured FRET efficiency depends on the calcium concentration). Original variants of cameleons were originally more sensitive to Ca2+ and were acid quenched. Such shortcomings were abrogated by Q69K and V68L mutations. Both of these residues were close to the buried anionic chromophore and these mutations probably hinder protonation, conferring greater pH resistance.

GECI	Year	Sensing	Reporting	Precursor
Cameleons	1997	Calmodulin	FRET pair: BFP or CFP, and GFP or YFP	-
FIP-CB_{SM}	1997	Calmodulin	FRET pair: BFP and RFP	-
Pericams	2000	Calmodulin	cpGFP	-
GCaMP	2000	Calmodulin	cpEGFP	-
TN-L15	2004	Modified chicken skeletal muscle troponin C	FRET pair: YFP (Citrine) and CFP (Cerulean)	-
TN-humTnC	2004	Human cardiac troponin C	FRET pair: YFP (Citrine) and CFP (Cerulean)	-
TN-XL	2006	Modified chicken skeletal muscle troponin C	FRET pair: permuted YFP (Citrine) and CFP (Cerulean)	TN-L15
TN-XXL	2008	Modified csTnC in TN-XL	FRET pair: permuted YFP (Citrine) and CFP (Cerulean)	TN-XL
Twitch's	2014	Troponin C	FRET pair (various of two FPs)	-
RCaMP1	2013	Calmodulin	mRuby (red FP)	-
jRGECO1a	2016	Calmodulin	mApple (red FP)	R-GECO
G-Ca-FLITS	2025	Calmodulin	green FLIM sensor	Tq-Ca-FLITS

Of growing importance in calcium detection are near-IR (NIR) GECIs, which may open up avenues for multiplexing different indicator systems and allowing deeper tissue penetration. NIR GECIs rely on biliverdin-binding fluorescent proteins, which are largely derived from bacterial phytochromes. NIR systems are similar to inverse pericams in that both experience a decrease in fluorescence upon Ca2+ binding. RCaMPs and RGECOs are functional at 700+ nm, but are quite dim. A Cameleon analog involving NIR FRET has been successfully constructed as well.

A special class of GECIs are designed to form a permanent fluorescent tag in active neurons. They are based on the photoswitchable protein Eos which turns from green to red through photocatalyzed (with violet light) backbone cleavage. Combined with the CaM, violet light photoconverts only neurons that have elevated calcium levels. SynTagMA is a synapse-targeted version of CaMPARI2.

GECI	Year	Sensing	Reporting	Precursor
CaMPARI	2015	Calmodulin + violet light	mEos: green to red conversion	-
CaMPARI2	2018	Calmodulin + violet light	mEos: green to red conversion	CaMPARI
SynTagMA	2020	Calmodulin + violet light	mEos: green to red conversion	CaMPARI2
TubuTag	2021	Calmodulin + violet light	mEos: green to red conversion	CaMPARI2

While fluorescent systems are widely used, bioluminescent Ca2+ reporters may also hold potential because of their ability to abrogate autofluorescence, photobleaching [no excitation wavelength is needed], biological degradation and toxicity, in addition to higher signal-to-noise ratios. Such systems may rely on aequorin and the luciferin coelenterazine. Ca2+ binding causes a conformational change that facilitates coelenterazine oxidation. The resultant photoproduct emits blue light as it returns to the ground state. Colocalization of aequorin with GFP facilitates BRET/CRET (Bioluminescence or Chemiluminescence Resonance Energy Transfer), resulting in a 19 - 65 times brightness increase. Such structures can be used to probe millimolar to nanomolar calcium concentrations. A similar system invokes obelin and its luciferin coelenteramide, which may possess faster calcium response time and Mg2+ insensitivity than its aqueorin counterpart. Such systems can also leverage the self-assembly of luciferase components. In a system dubbed "nano-lantern," the luciferase RLuc8 is split and placed on different ends of CaM. Calcium binding brings the RLuc8 components in close proximity, reforming luciferase, and allowing it to transfer to an acceptor fluorescent protein.

To minimize damage to the visualized cells, two-photon microscopy is often invoked to detect the fluorescence from the reporters. The use of near-IR wavelengths and minimization of axial spread of the point function allows for nanometer resolution and deep penetration into the tissue. The dynamic range is often determined from such measurements. For non-ratiometric indicators (typically single protein indicators), it is the ratio of the fluorescence intensities obtained under Ca2+ saturated and depleted conditions, respectively. However, for ratiometric indicators, the dynamic range is the ratio of the maximum FRET efficiency ratio (calcium saturated) to the minimum FRET efficiency ratio (calcium depleted). Yet another common quantity used to measure signals produced by calcium concentration fluxes is the signal-to-baseline ratio (SBR), which is simply the ratio of the change in fluorescence (F - F0) over the baseline fluorescence. This can be related to the SNR (signal to noise ratio) by multiplying the SBR by the square root of the number of counted photons.

== Usage ==
Regardless of the type of indicator used, the imaging procedure is generally very similar. Cells loaded with an indicator, or expressing it in the case of a GECI, can be viewed using a fluorescence microscope and captured by a Scientific CMOS (sCMOS) camera or CCD camera. Confocal and two-photon microscopes provide optical sectioning ability so that calcium signals can be resolved in microdomains such as dendritic spines or synaptic boutons, even in thick samples such as mammalian brains. Images are analyzed by measuring fluorescence intensity changes for a single wavelength or two wavelengths expressed as a ratio (ratiometric indicators). If necessary, the derived fluorescence intensities and ratios may be plotted against calibrated values for known Ca^{2+} levels to measure absolute Ca^{2+} concentrations. Light field microscopy methods extend functional readout of neural activity capabilities in 3D volumes.

Methods such as fiber photometry, miniscopes and two-photon microscopy offer calcium imaging in freely behaving and head-fixed animal models.
