= Polarized membrane =

Lipid membrane with a charge differential

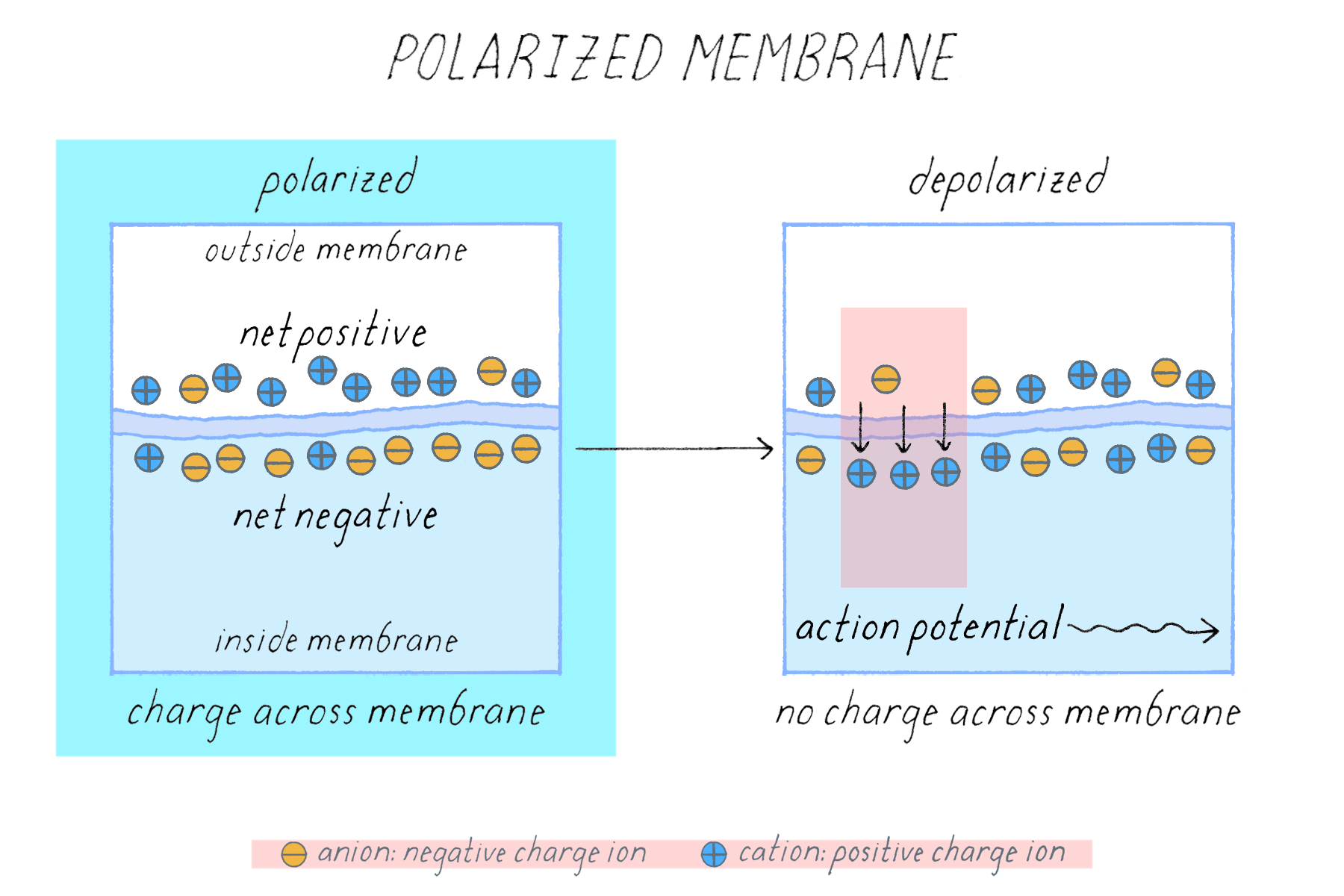
Membrane polarization refers to a cell’s resting membrane potential, where the inside of the cell is more negatively charged relative to the outside.

A polarized membrane is a lipid membrane that has a positive electrical charge on one side and a negative charge on another side, which produces the resting potential in living cells. Whether or not a membrane is polarized is determined by the distribution of dissociable protons and permeant ions inside and outside the membrane that travel passively through ion channel or actively via ion pump, creating an action potential.

== Structure and composition ==
Polarized membranes consist of a phospholipid bilayer, with embedded membrane proteins that aid in molecular transport and membrane stability as well as lipids that primarily aid in structure and compartmentalization of membrane proteins. The amphiphilic nature of the phospholipids creates the bilayer structure of the membrane. These phospholipids contain a hydrophilic head region with a phosphate bonded to a variety of functional groups. This head region is localized to face the extracellular space outside of the cell as well as the intracellular, cytosolic region of the cell. The hydrophobic phospholipid tail region consists of a chain of carbon molecules bound to hydrogen with two categories: saturated or unsaturated.

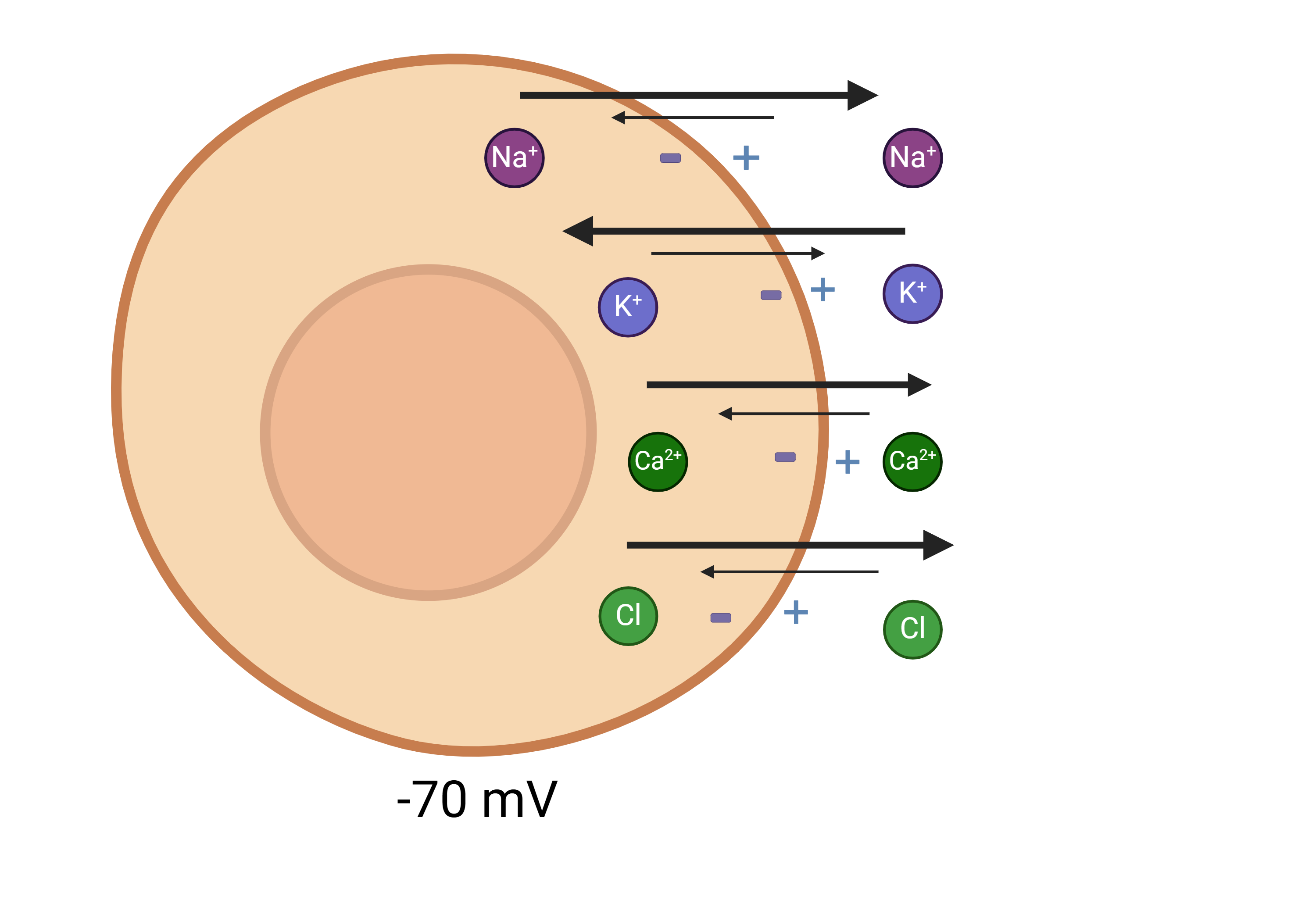
Polarized membrane due to inward and outward movement of ions

The polarization of cellular membranes are established and maintained through the active and passive transport of ions across the membrane through membrane proteins, specifically channel proteins and ion pumps. These proteins maintain an electrochemical gradient by pumping certain ions in and out of the cell. This gradient of ions lead to a positive charge on one side and a negative charge on the other.

The primary mechanism for generating this electrochemical gradient is the activity of the sodium-potassium pump (Na/K ATPase), which utilizes active transport to pump two potassium (K+) ions into the cell and three sodium (Na+) ions out of the cell per cycle. This is a P-class protein, meaning it is phosphorylated in the process and utilizes adenosine triphosphate (ATP) as an energy source.

Ion channels, which are specific in which ions are allowed to pass through them, are also crucial to polarization and maintaining polarization. Voltage-gated ion channels activate or deactivate in response to changes in membrane potential, allowing various ions to flow down their concentration gradient according to the channel's specificity. These channels are crucial in the propagation and transduction of action potentials in the nervous system, when transient activation and deactivation of said ion channels enable signal transduction.

== Role in Cellular Functions ==
Polarized membranes are key cellular components that aid in facilitating compartmentalization, cell-to-cell communication, and signaling. Cells actively utilize polarized membranes to form and maintain electrochemical gradients and regulate both intracellular and extracellular environments. Polarization is crucial in a variety of cells, but especially important in neurons.

In neurons of the central nervous system and peripheral nervous system, polarized membranes allow for the propagation and transduction of action potentials. As explained above, this polarization is maintained by sodium-potassium pumps and a host of other ion channels ensuring an electrochemical gradient is sustained. These action potentials signal neurons to release neurotransmitters leading to further polarization of afferent neurons or a direct response to a signal.

Polarized membranes also function to maintain intracellular homeostasis in lysosomes. Lysosomes are cell organelles that are highly acidic and store proteases that aid in degradation of spent organelles or various biological polymers. The acidic nature of the inside of the lysosome is maintained by proton pumps which actively pump hydrogen ions into the lysosome. This mass movement of ions in and out of the lysosome lead to a polarized lysosomal membrane, with a negative resting potential.

== Types of Polarized Membranes ==
=== Plasma Membranes ===
Plasma membranes exhibit electrochemical polarity through establishment and maintenance of a resting membrane potential. Cells with polarized plasma membranes must buffer and adequately distribute certain ions, such as sodium (Na^{+}), potassium (K^{+}), calcium (Ca^{2+}), and chloride (Cl^{−}) to establish and maintain this polarity. Integral channel proteins such as the sodium-potassium pump actively maintain the electrochemical gradient through movement of sodium and potassium ions. Voltage-gated ion channels in neurons allow for transient changes in membrane potential, giving way for signal transduction through action potentials and/or neurotransmitter release.

=== Organelle Membranes ===
Mitochondria present in all cells in the human body require a resting membrane potential of the inner mitochondrial membrane to synthesize adenosine triphosphate (ATP). This membrane polarity is established through a series of proton pumps transporting hydrogen ions into the mitochondrion. This transport of hydrogen ions is a crucial component of energy storage during oxidative phosphorylation. The same mechanism is used to acidify lysosomes and acidify the intraorganellar space of the lysosome.

=== Membranes in Excitable Cells ===
Excitable cells, or cells that have the unique ability to generate and transduce electrical impulses, employ polarized membranes with highly fluctuant electrochemical gradients. Neurons and muscle fiber cells are the primary examples of excitable cells. Neuronal cells generate electrical signals through activation of voltage-gated ion channels, while muscle fiber cells use similar methods to coordinate muscle contraction.

=== Photosynthetic Membranes ===
Polarized membranes are not uniquely localized to humans or mammals alone. In plants, thylakoid membranes within the chloroplast generate and maintain electrochemical gradients vital for the photosynthetic pathway. Light-dependent reactions generate a proton gradient similar to that found in mitochondria, providing the necessary gradient needed to power ATP synthesis. This polarity generated by light-dependent reactions are converted into ATP and NADPH during the Calvin cycle.

== Technology and Techniques for Studying Polarized Membranes ==
Researchers and scientists alike use various techniques in order to study the properties and behaviors of these polarized membranes. These techniques and tools allow for precise measurements of individual ion channels and electrochemical gradients of certain ions across a cell's membrane. This area of research is highly beneficial in understanding the principles of excitable cells and allowing innovations in biotechnology and medical treatments.

=== Patch-Clamp Electrophysiology ===
Patch-clamp recording was a major innovation in the scientific community as it allowed for the measurement of the properties of one or a few ion channels in real time. This technique employs a glass micropipette with a tiny internal diameter that forms a tight seal on the surface of the cell's membrane (gigaohm seal). This gigaohm seal allows for measurement of current flow across a very small patch of membrane. Voltage clamp is a variation of patch clamp recording in which the membrane is held at a constant potential and measuring the current required to do so. This information is used to characterize the currents that underlie the action potential.

=== Fluorescent Imaging Techniques ===
Ion sensitive fluorescent dyes provide both spatial and temporal imaging of electrochemical gradients of certain ions (e.g. calcium or potassium). These fluorescent dyes change in intensity depending on concentrations of certain ions which are directly correlated to membrane potential. Fluo-4 is a calcium imaging fluorescent dye used to track intracellular calcium concentrations in living cells. This tracking is especially helpful in measuring growth and maturation of neuronal networks in learning as calcium is a key signaling and regulating molecule.

== See also ==
- Membrane transporter
