= Water resources management in Bolivia =

- Withdrawals by sector 2000/2001: Domestic: 12%; Agriculture: 82%; Industry: 6%
- Renewable water resources: 623 km^{3}
- Surface water produced internally: 277 km^{3}
- Groundwater recharge: 130 km^{3}
- Overlap shared by surface water and groundwater: 104 km^{3}
- External renewable water resources: 7 km^{3}
- Dependency ratio: 51.2%
- Renewable water resources per capita: 71,511 m^{3} per year
- Wetland designated as Ramsar sites: 65,000 km^{3}
- Hydropower generation: 40%

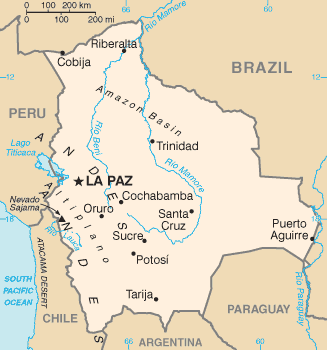
Map of Bolivia from the CIA World Factbook.

Bolivia has traditionally undertaken different water resources management approaches aimed at alleviating political and institutional instability in the water sector. The so-called water wars of 2000 and 2006 in Cochabamba and El Alto, respectively, added social unrest and conflict into the difficulties of managing water resources in Bolivia. Evo Morales’ administration is currently developing an institutional and legal framework aimed at increasing participation, especially for rural and indigenous communities, and separating the sector from previous privatization policies. In 2009, the new Environment and Water Resources Ministry was created absorbing the responsibilities previously under the Water Ministry. The Bolivian Government is in the process of creating a new Water Law – the current Water Law was created in 1906 – and increasing much needed investment on hydraulic infrastructure.

== Water management history and recent developments ==
The 1906 Water Law (Ley general de aguas) marks the beginning of Bolivia's 20th Century water resources policy. The Water Law includes provisions such as water as a public good and establish Bolivian government as main authority responsible for water management. The definition of water rights is vague, “the water passing through the land belongs to the land owner as long as it does not affect others.” No provision is included for neither groundwater property rights nor water tariffs. The Water Law was minimally modified on 1945, to specify that “no water right includes the right to deny access to water to downstream water users.” In 1988, the Senate prepared a draft to modify the Water Law to include provisions such as groundwater as public domain, and to establish a water fee for farmers based on the area benefited with improved irrigation infrastructure. Similar attempts occurred in 1995 and 1999, when the government together with the World Bank and GTZ drafted a Water Law including some fundamental principles included in the 1988 version plus provisions on institutional framework and concessions of water rights. None of the three drafts turned into a new Water Law.

Despite these efforts to concentrate water resources management into a single legal document, the different sectors involved in water use continue to act separately in accordance with several laws such as the Electricity Act, the Hydrocarbon Act, the Mining Code and the Environmental act. The lack of a clear legal and institutional framework has made difficult to ensure appropriate quality and quantity of water for the different water users in the medium and long term.

== Water resources base ==
=== Surface and groundwater resources ===
Bolivia can be divided into three areas, which correspond to the eastern area (a tropical and subtropical region), the western area (the arid, semi arid and sub-humid dry region), and the Titicaca basin. The hydrographic system consists of three large basins:

- the Amazon Basin which measures approximately 724,000 km^{2} and covers 66% of Bolivia's territory;
- the closed (endorheic) basin, which measures 145,081 km^{2} or 13% of the territory; and
- the Rio Plata Basin, which covers 229,500 km^{2} or 21% of the nation's territory.

The Amazon basin has a high flow of water and it is prone to floods. The Parana basin represents approximately 42% of the total area of Bolivia and it is prone to droughts and desertification. The quantity and quality of hydrological information is very poor.

River Basins in Bolivia

Basin Name	Main Rivers	Surface Area (1000 km2)	Average Flow (km3/year)
Amazon Basin	Madre de Dios, Orthon, Abuna, Beni, Grande, Mamoré e Itenez	887	572
Plata	Pilcomayo, Bermejo, San Juan y Paraguay	234	47.5
Altiplano	Desaguadero, Lake Titicaca, Poopó, Salares de Uyuni y Coipasa	191	14.7

Source: FAO

=== Storage capacity ===
According to the Food and Agriculture Organization, Bolivia has five dams aimed mostly at hydropower generation.

== Environmental aspects ==
=== Water quality ===
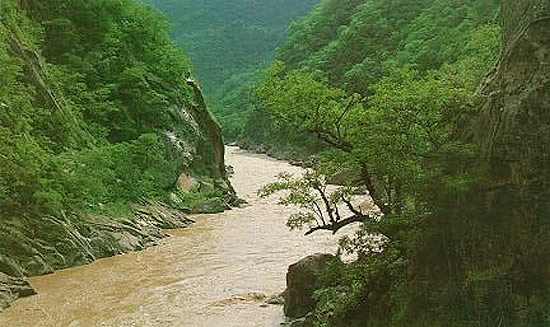
Río Pilcomayo

The gradual decrease in Bolivia's water quality is due to the release of untreated effluents from industries and cities. For example, in the Andean region, rivers transport high values of organic material, up to 100 mg/L. This water is used for irrigated agriculture downstream.

In the Amazon region, erosion and land use upstream, especially mining, deteriorate water quality due to high concentration of sediments. Forestry and agriculture also affect water quality in Bolivia. For example, sugarcane production is considered one of the main causes in the decreasing on fisheries in the Rio Pirai (Santa Cruz)

=== Water related risks ===
Natural disasters directly affect Bolivia's development; because they cause capital losses, and damage hydraulic and other type of infrastructures. Such losses, in turn, influence economic indicators such as inflation and production, which in turn increase poverty. Floods and landslides in the rainy season affect a wide range of hydraulic infrastructure. Since year 2000, a notable increase in climate-related disaster situations have been observed in Bolivia, some of them associated with El Niño/La Niña events. In 2002, the Potosi Province experienced an unprecedented heavy snow storm, which affected about 3,000 inhabitants and killed 20,000 animals; and the La Paz Province was struck by a destructive hail, causing the death of 70 persons and US$70 million in losses. In 2004, a prolonged drought affected the Chaco Region, which consists of the Departments of Santa Cruz, Chuquisaca and Tarija, threatened the food security, health and nutritional status of approximately 180,000 people, of which 15 percent were children. El Niño 2006/2007 event caused economic losses estimated at US$0.44 billion or 4 percent of gross domestic product (GDP) and affected about 133,100 families or 0.56 million people, equivalent to five times the population affected by El Niño 1997/1998. About 54 percent of the losses occurred in the rural areas. La Niña 2007/2008 event caused damage and losses evaluated at US$0.52 billion, 20 percent higher than the previous event and affected about 123,600 families. The agricultural sector absorbed about 53 percent of these losses and damage.

=== Potential climate change impacts ===
According to a study about Climate Change in Bolivia published in 2007 by the Bolivian Government, the anticipated effects of Climate Change on water resources are:

- Extreme events: Hydrometeorological extreme events are frequent in Bolivia and will tend to rise in magnitude and intensity by the effect of climate change. The IPCC (2001) foresees greater frequency and intensity of extreme events due to climate change. In recent years, the occurrence of tropical storms has increased in Bolivia, with winds higher than 28 m/s according to the Beaufort scale, causing major damage. It has also been observed presence of convective movements with violent hail storms as those registered in the city of La Paz in February 2002 and 2003.
- Droughts: Climate change could exacerbate water shortages in the arid and semi-arid valleys and reduce water availability in the highlands. Many productive and urban areas are located in the arid or semi-arid region with rudimentary water systems supplied by wells or rivers. These supply systems are vulnerable to water availability, since they lack reservations that would make water available during the dry season.
- Floods: Climate change could increase intense rainfall causing floods that could lead to significant infrastructural damage. According to regional scenarios, it is expected a reduction of periods of rain with an increased probability of heavy rainfall in a short time. In this sense the country still lacks systems to study rainfall patterns as well as early warning systems which increase the vulnerability of the populations especially those in unplanned settlements. In addition, many basins in Bolivia do count with integrated water resources management system in place with activities aimed at watershed protection. This translates into degradation of soils, declining aquifer recharge, reduced availability of water, which overall reduces economic productivity and income of its inhabitants.
- Glacier Retreat: Documented glaciers retreat, due to increase of temperatures, may increase seasonal runoff in the short term and increase dependency on seasonal rainfall for water supply in the medium and long term. According to Francou, Bolivia's Chacaltaya glacier, situated 20 km NE of the city of La Paz, has lost 82% of its surface area since 1982 and may completely melt by 2013. (See Impacts of Glacier Retreat in the Andes:Documentary)

Anticipated impacts of Climate Change by Region

Region	Change scenario	Anticipated impacts
Altiplano	Increased precipitation, increased frequency of storms with fewer days of rain, increased frequency of hail, lower river flow	Increasing appearance of frost, increasing need of water for irrigation due to longer dry season, problems with hydropower generation, glacier retreat, crop failure, flooding in the rainy season, lower availability of water for human and animal consumption, lower aquifer recharge, increased competition for water use
Andean Valleys	Increased precipitation, increased frequency of storms with fewer days of rain, increased frequency of hail	Increased competition for water use, biodiversity loss, increasing need of water for irrigation due to longer dry season, increased risk of mudslides, problems with power generation, soil erosion and desertification
Chaco	Longer dry season during the growing season, intense and recurrent droughts, low river flow	Increased competition for water use, biodiversity loss, increased events of heat waves during the summer, soil erosion and desertification, increased pollution of water sources
Amazon	An increase in the amount of rainfall by event, increased cloudiness rate, high atmospheric humidity in summer and severe droughts and winter	Frequent flooding, infrastructure damage and loss, winter crop failure and livestock loss due to lack of water, increased presence of pests and diseases due to high humidity, biodiversity loss, outbreaks of infectious diseases related to water.

Source: National Program for Climate Change

== Water resources management by sector ==
=== Drinking water and sanitation ===
Bolivia’s water and sanitation coverage has greatly improved since 1990 due to a considerable increase in sectoral investment. However, the country continues to suffer from what happens to be the continent’s lowest coverage levels as well as from low quality of services. The lowest levels of coverage are found in the departments of Pando, Potosí, and Oruro. Increasing coverage requires a substantial increase of investment financing, which has dropped back since 2000.

The next table reflects access to water supply and sanitation services in 2006.

		Urban (64% of the population)	Rural (36% of the population)	Total
Water	Broad definition	95%	68%	85%
Water	House connections	90%	44%	73%
Sanitation	Broad definition	60%	22%	46%
Sanitation	Sewerage	39%	2%	26%

Source: Joint Monitoring Program WHO/UNICEF(JMP /2006). Data for water and sanitation based on the Housing Survey (2002), Bolivia Democratic and Health Survey (2003), and Survey of Multiple Indicators by Conglomerates (Encuesta de Multiples Indicadores por Conglomerados, 2000).

=== Irrigation and drainage ===
The government considers irrigated agriculture as a major contributor to "better quality of life, rural and national development" and is undertaking a major institutional reform in sector including the creation of a National Irrigation Plan. Bolivia has an irrigated area of approximately 2,265 km^{2} or about 11% of the total agriculture land 21,000 km^{3}. There are about 5,000 irrigation systems in Bolivia, most of them located in the South and Southwestern areas (Valles and Antiplano). These irrigation systems consist of rudimentary web of canals supplied by rainfall with few regulatory schemes such as dams, which makes them very vulnerable to seasonality of rain. Overall efficiency of irrigation systems varies from 18 to 49% in traditional systems to 35-50% in improved systems.

=== Hydropower ===
The electricity sector in Bolivia was privatized in the early 1990s. The supply is dominated by thermal generation (60%), while hydropower (40%) has a smaller share in its generation mix compared to other South American countries (LAC average hydropower capacity is 51%). The electricity coverage in rural areas is among the lowest in Latin America.

=== Aquatic ecosystems ===
Bolivian ecosystems are linked with the characteristics of every river basin. The Endorreic basin hosts a typical Central Andean dry puna, the inter-Andean valleys host mountain forest, and the east valleys host tropical forests and wet savannas. The endorreic basin, with little vegetation and precipitation and 40% of Bolivia's population, has traditionally been dedicated to agriculture and mining. In the inter-Andean valleys, with steep slopes, there is a need for irrigation and terraces to avoid soil erosion. These valleys produce high crop yields and benefit Bolivia's overall economy. Drainage systems and fragility of soil are the main challenges in the tropical east. Agriculture in this area has grown to produce soya, cotton, sunflowers, and sugarcane.

== Legal and institutional framework ==
=== Legal framework ===
The former Water Ministry made an effort to draft a Water Law integrating the multipurpose use of water on a coherent and unique legal document. It is uncertain whether the new Environment and Water Resources Ministry will continue with this effort. In the meantime, two of the most important sectors in terms of social effect are regulated under a specific law, namely the Water and Sanitation Services Law No. 2066 and the Irrigation Law No. 7828.

The Irrigation Law establishes a system for granting and registering traditional water user rights “guaranteeing legally and permanently water for irrigation.” This registration of water rights for irrigation limits somehow the way in which the government can grant access to other water users through the future Water Law. .

The Water and Sanitation Services Law No. 2029 of 1999, was revised in 2000 after Cochabamba's water war into Law No. 2066. The new law includes provisions for protection of traditional water-sharing arrangements through a system of official licenses and increase local communities participation in decision-making processes such as the establishment of water tariffs. The Agency for the Supervision of Basic Sanitation (SISAB), (Superintendencia de Agua y Saneamiento Basico) which grants concessions and licenses and establishes the principles to set prices, tariffs, taxes, and quotas, was not modified by the new Law. The Government of Evo Morales considers passing a new water and sanitation services law called “Water for Life”. According to Vice-Minister Rene Orellana, this new legal framework would eliminate the SISAB and introduce a decentralized regulator in its place. Regulatory taxes would be eliminated along with the legal concept of the concession. A preferential electricity tariff would be introduced for EPSAs and community water rights would be strengthened.

=== Institutional framework ===
The Environment and Water Resources Ministry, the national water authority, created in 2009 is responsible for planning, implementing, monitoring, evaluating, and funding plans and policies for water resources management. It consists of three vice ministries: (i) water supply and basic sanitation, (ii) water resources and irrigation, and (iii) environment, biodiversity and climate change.

At the regional level, and according to the Administrative Decentralization Law, the prefectures are responsible for water management and conservation of water resources, including integrated water resources management under a river basing management approach.

At the local level, the municipalities are responsible for water management and development inside its jurisdiction according to the Municipalities Law. Local actors include water users and farmer organizations, campesino communities, indigenous people, public and private enterprises, NGOs, Universities, and public local entities.

The Interinstitucional del Agua (CONIAG), created in 2002 though Decree No. 26599, is aimed at create a forum for government, social and economic organizations to agree on legal, institutional and technical aspects related to water resources management.

=== Government strategy ===
Morales’ administration is currently in the process of developing water resources management in Bolivia under the framework of the Policy known as “Agua para Todos.” Particularly the government is aiming at: (i) establishing a sustainable, participatory, and integral water resources management through the Water Resources Management National Strategy, River Basin National Plan and Water Sector Information Program; (ii)protecting ecosystems through a Desertification Prevention Plan; (iii)increasing civil society collaboration through a Coordination Mechanisms Strengthening Plan

== Economic aspects ==
=== Water pricing, cost recovery and subsidies ===
The Water Law of 1906 did not establish any type of payment for water use. Irrigation legislation establishes a payment for water use equal to maintenance of the water system. The irrigation associations are in charge of establishing the water tariff which does not include cost recovery or upgrading or extending the water system.

For water supply and sanitation in rural areas, there are per capita subsidies of US$70 for water supply and 65US$ for sanitation. Moreover, there is an indirect subsidy on interest rates for internal financing funds and those projects co financed by Non-governmental organizations.

The campesino and indigenous community have never paid for water use. This together with the fact that they are the poorest group in Bolivia has traditionally excluded this group for water user tariffs in Water Law drafted in the past. Moreover, the Water Law of 1906 does not either establish a system to grant water rights. Hence to this date, there is no document or title defining who and to which extent water can be used in Bolivia.

=== National investment ===
Bolivia's national investment on water resources has been in decline at the beginning of this century but has increased in the last couple of years.

Budgeted and actual investment on water resources

Year	Budgeted (US$1,000)	% total budget	Invested (US$1,000)	% Total budget	% Budget invested
1999	4,979	N/A	2,134	N/A	42.9
2000	3,666	N/A	5,840	N/A	159.3
2001	6,803	N/A	8,335	N/A	122.5
2002	6,803	N/A	8,335	N/A	146.9
2003	119,527	2.4	85,249	2.2	71.3
2004	74,849	2.0	95,542	2.2	127.6
2005	61,283	1.3	140,102	2.7	228.8
2006	113,531	2.0	146,102	2.7	228.6
2007	162,245	1.8	242,132	3.0	149.2

Source: Vice Ministry of Public Investment and External Financing

=== External cooperation ===
The Inter-American Development Bank is currently implementing a US$300,000 project to create a strategy for integrated management of water resources together with the Water Ministry.

The Dutch and Swedish cooperation agencies collaborated with the River Basin and Water Resources Viceministry to create the River Basin National Plan. This plan was approved in May 2007. The River Basin and Water Resources Viceministry is implementing the plan in 12 selected basins in Cochabamba, Chuquisaca, Santa Cruz and Oruro departments with a total investment of US$6 million.

The Irrigation Viceministry has channeled national and cooperation funds including US$16 million from CAF – Development Bank of Latin America and the Caribbean, US$18 million from the German government and US$270 million from the Inter-American Development Bank with to prepare and implement a number of irrigation projects. (See article)

The World Bank assists the Bolivian Government in a number of projects with a water resources management component including: (i) Water Related Adaptation to Climate Change, (ii) Emergency Recovery and Disaster Management; (iii) Adaptation to the Impact of Rapid Glacier Retreat in the Tropical Andes; (iv) Urban Infrastructure for the Poor; and (v) Community Development and Food Security.

In the area of Climate Change, Bolivia – together with Bangladesh, Cambodia, Mozambique, Nepal, Niger, Tajikistan and Zambia – has been selected to be part of the Pilot Program for Climate Resilience (PPCR) under the Strategic Climate Fund. The PPCR will provide about $500 million for integrating climate resilience in national development planning. It is expected that water resources management will be an integral part of the activities supported by the fund, whose resources will be channelled through the regional development banks and the World Bank.
