= Fiber photometry =

Calcium imaging technique

Fiber photometry is a calcium imaging technique that captures 'bulk' or population-level calcium (Ca^{2+}) activity from specific cell-types within a brain region or functional network in order to study neural circuits Population-level calcium activity can be correlated with behavioral tasks, such as spatial learning, memory recall and goal-directed behaviors. The technique involves the surgical implantation of fiber optics into the brains of living animals. The benefits to researchers are that optical fibers are simpler to implant, less invasive and less expensive than other calcium methods, and there is less weight and stress on the animal, as compared to miniscopes. It also allows for imaging of multiple interacting brain regions and integration with other neuroscience techniques. The limitations of fiber photometry are low cellular and spatial resolution, and the fact that animals must be securely tethered to a rigid fiber bundle, which may impact the naturalistic behavior of smaller mammals such as mice.

== Technical description ==
Fiber photometry relies on the expression of genetically encoded calcium indicators (GECIs), like GCaMP or RCaMP, which can be targeted to specific cells using cell-specific promoters like Ca2+/calmodulin-dependent protein kinase II (CaMKII) and human synapsin (hSyn) that confer excitatory neuronal and pan-neuronal expression, respectively. These promoters can be used to target various neuronal subtypes as well as non-neuronal cells that exhibit calcium dynamics, such as astrocytes, using the glial fibrillary acidic protein (GFAP) promoter. In both neurons and astrocytes, cellular activity in the form of action potentials, exocytosis of neurotransmitters, changes in synaptic plasticity and gene transcription is coupled to an influx of Ca^{2+} ions.

These activity-dependent changes in intracellular calcium levels can be monitored by introducing GECIs to the cell. When the concentration of calcium ions is low, GECIs show weak or no fluorescence. Following influx of ions, the fluorescent proteins that GECIs contain (such as mScarlet or GFP) are activated upon Ca^{2+} binding. Irradiation of these proteins with light of the correct wavelength delivered through the photofiber excites the now fluorescent GECIs, which in turn emit photons of a lower wavelength (Stokes shift). These photons are then returned through the photofiber and counted by a detector.

The change in fluorescence corresponds proportionally to intracellular calcium changes. The most commonly used calcium indicator for fiber photometry (and other in vivo imaging method) is GCaMP6, although additional GECIs continue to be developed with unique fluorescence spectra, kinetics, signal-to-noise ratios and calcium-sensitivities. These indicators can be expressed in the brain in two main ways: viral expression and transgenic mouse lines. Recently, there has been a growing list of indicators that have become available to measure different chemical signals, like dLight to record dopamine signaling, or OxLight to record orexin, for example. GCaMP, RCaMP, dLight and other indicators are excited by a light source at an optimal wavelength and emit their own light in return, allowing for recording of calcium or neurotransmitter dynamics across time.

Fiber photometry systems are designed to deliver precise excitation wavelengths of light that are specific to a calcium (e.g. GCaMP) or neurotransmitter indicator (e.g. dLight). This light travels down an optical fiber to a fiber optic that is implanted in the brain region or regions of interest. The calcium indicator is that is expressed in a cell-type specific manner is excited by this light and in turn, emits its own signal that travels back through the same fiber. These collected emission signals are spectrally separated by a dichroic mirror, passed through a filter and focused onto a photodetector, scientific camera, or PMT. The collected signal represents a change in fluorescence (ΔF) relative to an initial baseline (F). In turn, researchers can observe a signal that corresponds to calcium transients (ΔF/F). This time series data can be analyzed using a variety of open-source pipelines, such as pMAT, pyPhotometry and GuPPy.

Importantly, isosbestic signals are calcium-independent signals (i.e. approximately 405-415 nm) that are in contrast to the calcium-dependent wavelength (i.e. 470 nm for GCaMP). Because GCaMP has two states, Ca^{2+} bound and un-bound, the two protein conformations have unique excitation and emission spectra. The wavelength of excitation at which GCaMP has the same absorbance with and without Ca^{2+} is the isosbestic and determines the calcium-independent fluorescence baseline. Animal motion and tissue autofluorescence are reflected in this calcium-independent signal and can be subtracted or regressed to reveal the true change in fluorescence.

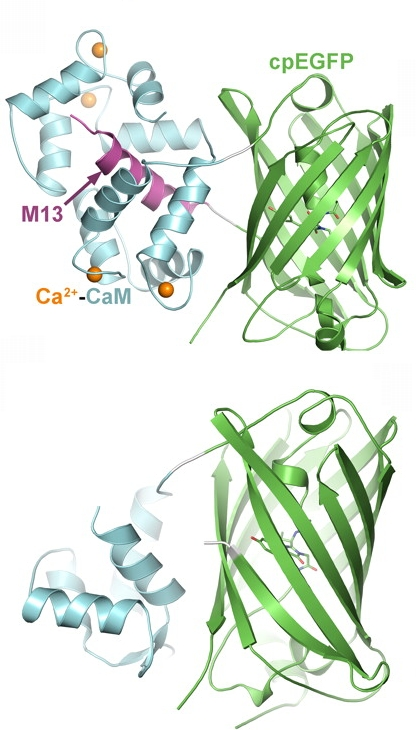
Structure of GCaMP, a genetically encoded calcium indicator commonly used in calcium imaging methods, such as fiber photometry, one- and two-photon microscopy.

== Genetically-encoded calcium indicators (GECIs) ==
=== Expression ===
Optimal expression of genetically encoded calcium indicators (GECIs) can be accomplished in two ways: adeno-associated viral vectors and transgenic rodent lines. Viral injection requires GECI infusion into the brain region of interest. This virus can be targeted to infect unique cell-types through the use of cell-specific promoters like CaMKII and GFAP to target excitatory neurons and astrocytes, respectively. This allows for neural activity to be recorded from a genetically defined subpopulation of neurons or glial cells through an implanted optical fiber. Viral expression requires titration of dilutions to obtain optimal expression in the brain, which may be necessary instead of using transgenic rodent lines for certain experiments. Expression of GECIs can also be accomplished through the use of transgenic lines that allow for ubiquitous expression throughout the entire brain. Depending on the strain of mouse or rat, the expression can vary across brain regions, posing potential challenges during recording.

=== GCaMP ===
GCaMP is a genetically encoded calcium indicator (GECI) that is commonly used in multiple imaging methods. GCaMP emits fluorescence when the indicator is bound to a calcium ion (Ca^{2+}). This calcium signal is directly tied to neural response patterns, neurotransmitter release, and membrane excitability. The excitation wavelengths for GCaMP and its isosbestic signal are approximately 470 nm and 415 nm (blue), respectively. The goal is to photo-excite the maximum absorption and isosbestic points of the indicator. The isosbestic point of GCaMP is the calcium-independent signal, approximately 405-415 nm. This is determined based on GCaMP having two functional states, bound and unbound to calcium ions. These two states have unique protein excitation and emission spectra. The wavelength of excitation where these two protein states have the same absorbance is the isosbestic point and determines the baseline fluorescence. Motion and autofluorescence are reflected in this calcium-independent signal and can be subtracted or regressed to reveal the true change in cellular fluorescence during a behavioral task or experimental manipulation.

The emission wavelength of GCaMP is approximately 525 nm (green), which can be analyzed and correlated across time during behavioral tasks.

=== Multiple-color fiber photometry ===
To observe simultaneous calcium dynamics in multiple cell types, researchers have combined two or more GECIs in a single brain region. For example, a research group recorded fluorescence from the green and red GECIs, GCaMP6f and jRGECO1a, that were differentially expressed in striatal direct- and indirect-pathway spiny projection neurons in freely behaving mice. The expression of multiple GECIs in the same brain region can not only be performed in two sets of neurons, as shown in the previous study. These simultaneous recordings of bulk calcium can also be performed with multiple cell types, such as neurons and astrocytes. These cell types express unique promoters, such as GFAP and hSyn, and the GECIs can be targeted specifically in this way. Another research group performed successful dual-color fiber photometry using astrocyte- and neuron-specific promoters while mice freely performed a working memory task (T-maze).

Example of genetically encoded calcium indicator (GECI), Lck-GCaMP3 expressed in acute brain slice astrocytes during a calcium imaging session.

== Equipment ==
The goal of fiber photometry is to precisely deliver, extract and record bulk calcium signal from specific populations of cells within a brain region of interest. To access the signal, an optical cannula/fiber must be surgically implanted at the site of GECI expression. This optical fiber can only collect population-level calcium signal, not individual cell activity. Additionally, optical fibers allow recording from both deep and shallow brain structures, and minimize tissue damage unlike GRIN lenses or cortical windows.

GCaMP has specific excitation and emission spectra at approximately 470 nm and 530 nm, respectively. LED light sources are amongst the most commonly selected, due to the low optical power necessary to excite GECIs. Proper transmission of the excitation and emission signals bidirectionally from the brain to the imaging device is coordinated by dichroic mirrors and excitation/emission filters. There are three different types of imaging devices: photodetectors, photomultiplier tubes (PMTs) and scientific cameras. When collecting signal from a single brain region, it is typical to use a photodetector or PMT due to their fast acquisition and high signal-to-noise ratio (SNR). Alternatively, when collecting from multiple brain regions, scientific cameras or multiple photodetectors or PMTs must be used.

Overall, this system allows for coupling between the optical cannula, light source and imaging device. Precise light delivery to the GECI is enabled by the optical cannula/fiber and the emission signal is collected by the imaging device during recording.

Some examples of commercially available fiber photometry systems include Neurophotometrics, Inscopix and MightexBio.

== Benefits and limitations ==
All scientific methods have considerations that must be taken into account before use. Fiber photometry has many benefits over other techniques for calcium imaging, but it comes with limitations.

=== Benefits ===
For individuals in labs that want to integrate calcium imaging into their experiments but may not have the financial or technical circumstances to do so yet, fiber photometry is a low barrier of entry. Optical fibers are simpler to implant, less invasive and are more inexpensive than other calcium methods such as one- or two-photon imaging. It is good for longitudinal behavioral paradigms because there is less weight and stress on the animal, as compared to miniscopes. It limits mobility of the animal significantly less than other methods, allowing for more freely moving, naturalistic behaviors in larger rodent models. It is a versatile technique, allowing for imaging of multiple interacting brain regions and integration with optogenetics, electrophysiology and more systems-level neuroscience techniques. More recently, this technique can be coupled with other fluorescent indicators for neurotransmitter activity or pH changes.

=== Limitations ===
It is important when planning experiments to consider the major limitation of fiber photometry: low cellular and spatial resolution. This lack of optical resolution can be attributed to the collection of an aggregation of activity within a field of view, only allowing for 'bulk' changes in fluorescent signal. Although the size of an optical cannula is much smaller than technology used in other calcium imaging methods, such as one- and two-photon microscopy, animals must be securely tethered to a rigid fiber bundle. This may limit the naturalistic behavior and of smaller mammals, such as mice.

== Integration with other methods ==
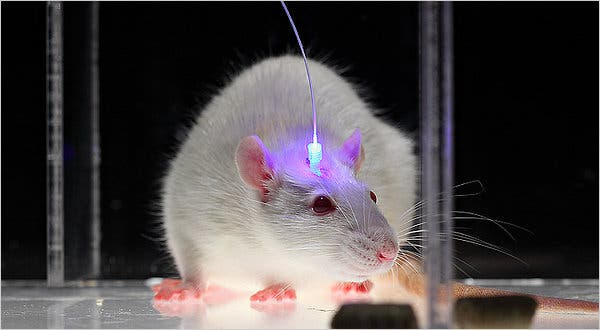
Rat receiving optogenetic stimulation via a fiber optic implant. This method can be combined with fiber photometry to manipulate and measure population calcium dynamics within a neural circuit.

=== Optogenetics and DREADDs ===
Fiber photometry can be integrated with cellular manipulation to draw a causal link between neural activity and behavior. Targeted modulation of defined cell types and projections in the brain can be accomplished using optogenetics or Designer Receptors Exclusively Activated by Designer Drugs (DREADDs). The method is chosen based on the temporal precision necessary for the experimental design, amongst other factors. Optogenetics allows for manipulation of a specific cell-type with high temporal precision. DREADDs have a much lower temporal precision due to the pharmacokinetics of the ligand, such as clozapine-N-oxide (CNO) or deschloroclozapine (DCZ). Simultaneous optical readout and optogenetic manipulation comes with several potential issues that are discussed below.

=== In vivo electrophysiology ===
Additionally, fiber photometry can be coupled with in vivo electrophysiology within the same animal. When combined, this combination of electrophysiological recording and calcium imaging can be used to observe cell-type specific activity with higher temporal precision read-outs of neuronal action potentials in freely behaving animal models.

=== Potential problems and solutions ===
Delivery and expression of optogenetic probes and calcium indicators to the same neurons can pose problems. Calcium indicators and manipulation channels can have overlapping excitation spectrums, such as GCaMP and channelrhodopsin (ChR2), which both have a peak wavelength of excitation at approximately 470 nm. Excitation of the calcium indicator can potentially activate the optogenetic light-sensitive ion channel. The measured change in calcium signal cannot be easily attributed to actual changes in calcium or optogenetic-induced signal. Solutions to this issue include the combination of indicators that have non-overlapping excitation spectrum with your optogenetic probe or calcium indicator. Calcium indicators (GCaMP, RCaMP) and optogenetic probes for excitation (ChR2, Crimson) and inhibition (eNpHR, Arch, Jaws) are options for this.

== Other calcium imaging methods ==
Multi-photon calcium imaging of mouse cerebellar neurons during a tail pinch. The change in fluorescence over baseline fluorescence (dF/F) and raw data are shown above.

=== Miniscopes and single-photon imaging ===
Miniscopes are head-mounted, miniature microscopes that allow imaging of large populations of neural activity in freely behaving mice and rats. This is possible due to their small size, as they are light enough for a mouse or rat to easily carry without interfering greatly with behavior. Researchers couple miniscopes with implanted gradient-refractive-index (GRIN) lenses or cortical windows that enable deep and superficial brain imaging. This method is ideal for monitoring the activity of hundreds of genetically- and spatially defined cells within a single animal. As compared to fiber photometry, miniscopes allow imaging with high cellular resolution, detecting changes in calcium within individual neurons and non-neuronal cells. Additionally, this method enables repeated imaging over time to analyze the transition from 'healthy' to pathological states or changes over the course of behavior. However, this method of imaging has low sensitivity and high noise, producing lower resolution imaging compared to other multi-photon methods like two-photon. These miniature microscopes are limited in their ability to detect far-red-shifted indicators that would be necessary for combination of optogenetics and calcium imaging here, as is discussed above.

=== Two-photon imaging ===
Two-photon imaging is another calcium imaging method that records fluctuations in cellular GECI dynamics. It provides a way to penetrate highly light-scattering brain tissue up to 600-700 microns below the surface of the brain. As compared to other techniques, two-photon offers higher cellular and sub-cellular spatial resolution, such as within dendrites and axonal boutons, within a well-defined focal plane. However, without the assistance of an optical cannula or micro-endoscope, this method is limited to more superficial brain areas. This type of imaging also requires that the animals remain head-fixed, limiting naturalistic behaviors necessary for some complex behavioral tasks.
