= Fura-2 =

- Fura-2

Identifiers
CAS Number	96314-98-6
3D model (JSmol)	Interactive image
ChemSpider	51442
PubChem CID	57054
UNII	TSN3DL106G
CompTox Dashboard (EPA)	DTXSID20242203
- InChI: InChI=1S/C29H27N3O14/c1-15-2-3-17(31(11-24(33)34)12-25(35)36)20(6-15)43-4-5-44-21-7-16-8-22(28-30-10-23(46-28)29(41)42)45-19(16)9-18(21)32(13-26(37)38)14-27(39)40/h2-3,6-10H,4-5,11-14H2,1H3,(H,33,34)(H,35,36)(H,37,38)(H,39,40)(H,41,42) Key: YFHXZQPUBCBNIP-UHFFFAOYSA-N; InChI=1/C29H27N3O14/c1-15-2-3-17(31(11-24(33)34)12-25(35)36)20(6-15)43-4-5-44-21-7-16-8-22(28-30-10-23(46-28)29(41)42)45-19(16)9-18(21)32(13-26(37)38)14-27(39)40/h2-3,6-10H,4-5,11-14H2,1H3,(H,33,34)(H,35,36)(H,37,38)(H,39,40)(H,41,42) Key: YFHXZQPUBCBNIP-UHFFFAOYAO
- SMILES: O=C(O)CN(c4ccc(cc4OCCOc3cc1c(oc(c1)c2ncc(o2)C(=O)O)cc3N(CC(=O)O)CC(=O)O)C)CC(=O)O

Properties
Chemical formula	C_{29}H_{22}N_{3}O_{14}K_{5}
Molar mass	831.99 g/mol
- Except where otherwise noted, data are given for materials in their standard state (at 25 °C [77 °F], 100 kPa). verify (what is ?) Infobox references

Fura-2, an aminopolycarboxylic acid, is a ratiometric fluorescent dye which binds to free intracellular calcium. It was the first widely used dye for calcium imaging, and remains very popular. Fura-2 is excited at 340 nm and 380 nm of light, and the ratio of the emissions at those wavelengths is directly related to the amount of intracellular calcium. Regardless of the presence of calcium, Fura-2 emits at 510 nm of light. The use of the ratio automatically cancels out confounding variables, such as variable dye concentration and cell thickness, making Fura-2 one of the most appreciated tools to quantify calcium levels. The high photon yield of fura-2 allowed the first real time (video rate) measurements of calcium inside living cells in 1986. More recently, genetically encoded calcium indicators based on spectral variants of the green fluorescent protein, such as Cameleons, have supplemented the use of Fura-2 and other small molecule dyes for calcium imaging, but Fura-2 remains faster.

== See also ==
- Fura-2AM, a membrane-permeant derivative of Fura-2
- Indo-1
