= Land reform =

Changing of laws, regulations, or customs regarding land ownership

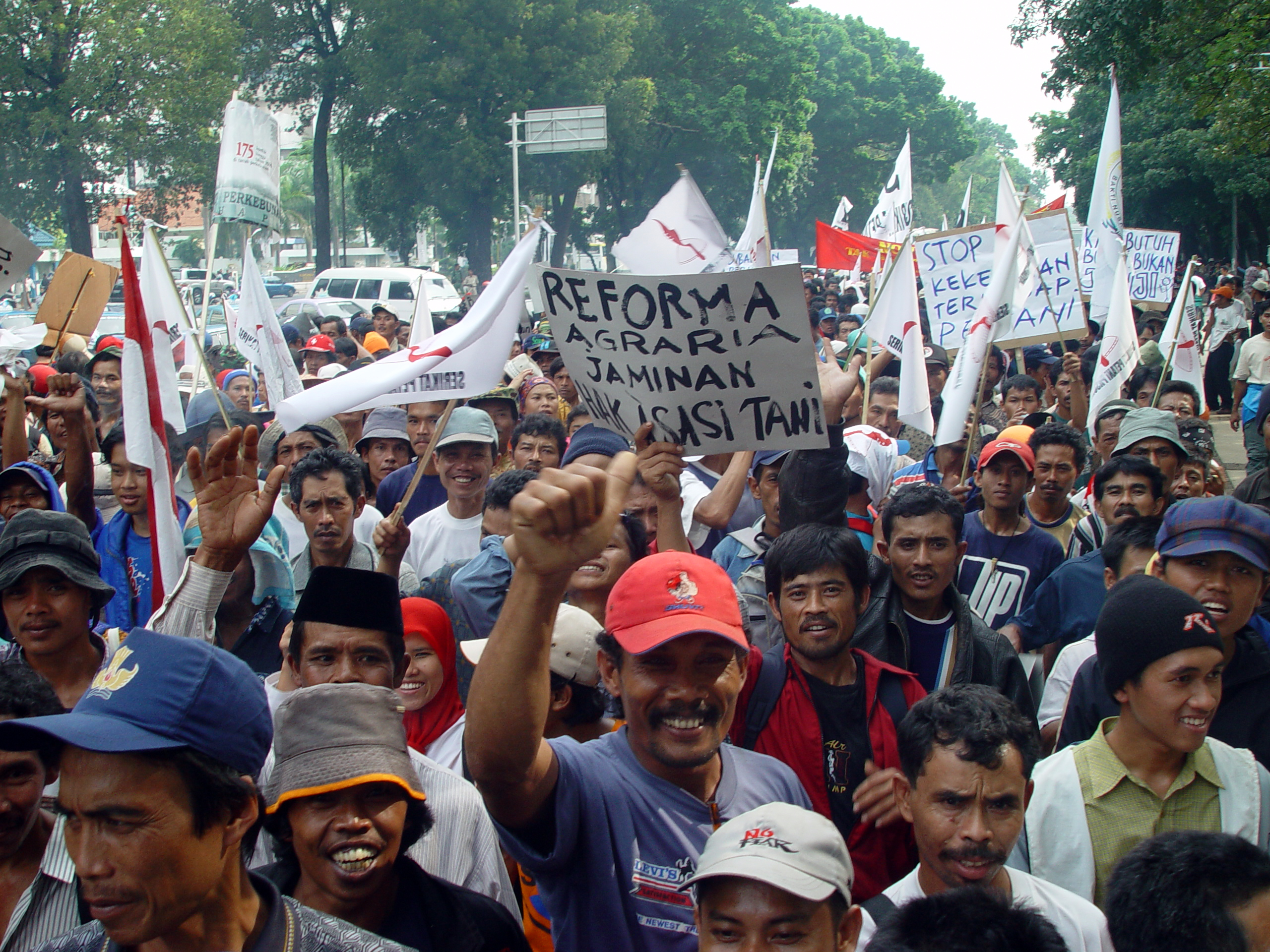
Farmers protesting for land reform in Indonesia in 2004

Land reform (also known as agrarian reform) refers to the process of changing who owns agricultural land and who has the right to use these lands. Land reform concerns the laws, regulations, or customs regarding land ownership, land use, land economics, and land transfers. Redistributive land reform refers to the narrower concept of transferring agricultural land ownership from large private landowners to small farmers and people without any landholdings. It involves the redistribution of wealth and political power that comes from owning large swathes of land.

Reforming the ownership of land may be initiated by governments or market forces, and at times have been sparked by revolution. In the 20th century, both capitalist and communist governments have enacted land reforms.

Land reform is a political process. It is often considered a contentious issue, as land is a key driver of a wide range of social, political and economic outcomes. The structure and distribution of land rights has been linked to state formation, economic growth, inequality, political violence, and identity politics, making land reform highly consequential for the long-term structures of society.

== Overview ==
Land reform refers to the transfer of ownership from the more powerful to the less powerful, such as from a relatively small number of wealthy or noble owners with extensive land holdings (e.g., plantations, large ranches, or agribusiness plots) to individual ownership by those who work the land. Such transfers can be government-initiated or government-backed. The transfer of ownership may be with or without compensation. Compensation can vary from token amounts to the full value of the land.

Land reform may entail the transfer of land from individual ownership—even peasant ownership in smallholdings—to government-owned collective farms. The term has also been used to refer to the exact opposite: the division of government-owned collective farms into smallholdings. The common characteristic of all land reforms is modification or replacement of existing institutional arrangements governing possession and use of land. While land reform may be radical in nature, such as large-scale transfers of land from one group to another, it can also be less dramatic, such as regulatory reforms aimed at improving land administration.

== Land usage and tenure ==
Land ownership can be seen as controversial in part because the ideas about what it means to access or control land can vary considerably across regions and even within countries. Land reforms, which change what it means to control land, therefore create tensions and conflicts between those who lose and those who gain from these redefinitions.

Western conceptions of land have evolved over the past several centuries to place greater emphasis on individual land ownership. The formal processes that developed historically also reinforce this view of land, for example through issuing official documents like land titles. However, control over land may also be perceived less in terms of individual ownership and more in terms of land use, or through what is known as land tenure. Historically, in many parts of Africa for example, land was not owned by an individual, but rather used by an extended family or a village community. Different people in a family or community had different rights to access this land for different purposes and at different times. Such rights were often conveyed through oral history and not formally documented. Today, groups of people who practice communal land use include, for example, the traditional peoples and communities in Brazil such as fundos de pasto and faxinais.

The terms which dictate control over and use of land can take many forms, and their choice reflects these different ideas of land ownership and tenure. For example, "formal" or "statutory" land systems refer to ideas of land control more closely affiliated with individual land ownership. "Informal" or "customary" land systems refer to ideas of land control more closely affiliated with land tenure.

Formal and informal land ownership come in a wide range of forms both historically and in the present day. Some of the different systems include:

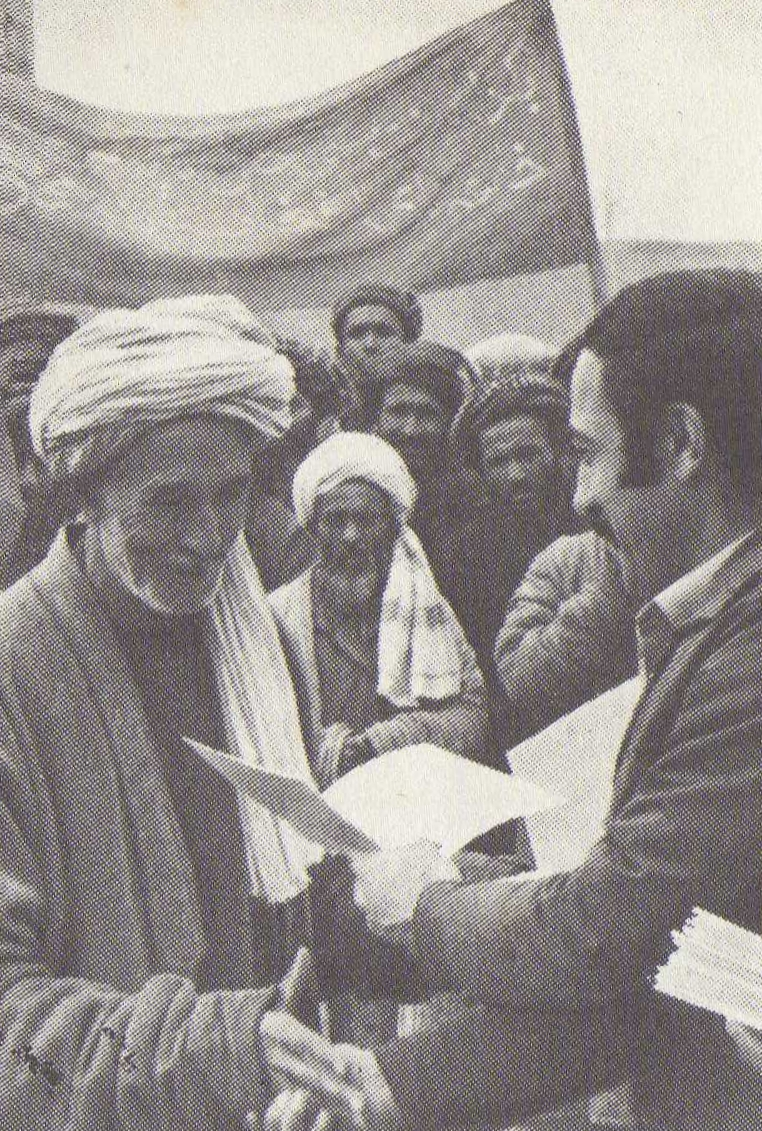
An Afghan farmer receiving ownership of land in 1978.

- Traditional land tenure, as practiced by the indigenous tribes of Pre-Columbian North America.
- Feudal land ownership, through fiefdoms
- Life estate, interest in real property that ends at death.
- Fee tail, hereditary, non-transferable ownership of real property.
- Fee simple. Under common law, this is the most complete ownership interest one can have in real property.
- Leasehold or rental
- Rights to use a common
- Sharecropping
- Run rig and rundale
- Well-field system
- Easements
- Kibbutz and moshav
- Satoyama
- Agricultural labor – under which someone works the land in exchange for money, payment in kind, or some combination of the two
- Collective ownership
- Access to land through a membership in a cooperative, or shares in a corporation, which owns the land (typically by fee simple or its equivalent, but possibly under other arrangements).
- Collective farms, such as those that might be found in communist states, whereby government ownership of most agricultural land is combined in various ways with tenure for farming collectives.
- Agrarian settlements, such as those implemented in Brazil since the middle of the 20th century.

== Motivations ==
Land reform is a deeply political process so the arguments around it concern ruling powers, political ideologies and economic systems. Historically, there have been a range of different social, political, and economic motivations and imperatives that led to land reform initiatives in various countries.

In the 19th century in colonized states, a colonial government may have changed the laws dictating land ownership to better consolidate political power or to support its colonial economy.

For much of the 20th century, nation states sponsored land reform for two broad agendas: gaining political legitimacy and providing conditions for development. Land reform has been widely recognized as a social justice measure to correct historical injustices and as an economic intervention that can break established patterns like landlordism and lead to structural transformation. 20th-century land reform initiatives have been driven by both capitalist and communist ideologies, and have at times been advanced through armed revolutions. Under Marxist theory, land reform is motivated by the necessity to abolish feudal and capitalist ground rent, eliminate class exploitation by landlords, and transition agricultural production into state or collective ownership. Alternatively, the economic tradition of Georgism, originating from Henry George's 1879 work Progress and Poverty, advocates for land reform via a Land value tax (LVT) to capture the unearned economic rent of land for public benefit, aiming to curb land speculation without expropriating private improvements or taxing labor. But since the emergence of neoliberalism in the 1980s, the general trend globally has been to roll back, contain, and block land reform while promoting market-oriented land policies.

Starting in the 1990s, voter mobilization and the use of land for providing political favors to supporters have also become possible motivations for land reform efforts, such as the extensive redistributive land reforms of Robert Mugabe in Zimbabwe.

Today, land reform efforts are increasingly understood as integral to broader struggles for food sovereignty, climate justice, and decolonization.

== Outcomes and challenges ==
Arguments in support of land reform focus on its potential social, economic and environmental benefits, particularly in developing countries, that may emerge from reforms focused on greater land formalization. Such benefits may include eradicating food insecurity, reducing gas emissions and alleviating rural poverty. Yet, land reform is an intensely political process and because of this many of those opposed to land reform are nervous as to the underlying motivations of those initiating the reform. For example, some may fear that they will be disadvantaged or victimized as a result of the reforms. Others may fear that they will lose out in the economic and political power struggles (especially in developing countries) that underlie many land reforms.

Contemporary support for such reforms gained particular momentum after the publication of The Mystery of Capital: Why Capitalism Triumphs in the West and Fails Everywhere Else by Peruvian economist Hernando de Soto in 2000. In his book, De Soto argues that the poor are often unable to secure formal property rights, such as land titles, to the land on which they live or farm because of poor governance, corruption and overly complex bureaucracies. Without land titles or other formal documentation of their land assets, they are less able to access formal credit. According to de Soto, political and legal reforms within countries will help to include the poor in formal legal and economic systems, increasing the poor's ability to access credit, and contributing to economic growth and poverty reduction.

Many international development organizations, such as the World Bank, have embraced de Soto's and others' ideas about the benefits of formalizing land rights. This has translated into a number of development programs that work with governments and civil society organizations to initiate and implement land reforms. However, opinions are divided about whether formalizing land rights is one-size-fits-all strategy that necessarily empowers the poor. For example, in Sub-Saharan Africa, where land registration and titling are advocated by various groups as a pro-poor strategy, there are often multiple, conflicting claims to the same land by different individuals or groups. This means that formalizing land rights would benefit some groups more than others and create tensions.

Land reforms can help resolving conflicting land laws, particularly in former colonies, where formal and informal land systems may exist in tension with each other. Such conflicts can make marginalized groups vulnerable to further exploitation. For example, in many African countries with conflicting land laws, AIDS stigmatization has led to an increasing number of AIDS widows being kicked off marital land by in-laws. While AIDS widows may have both customary and statutory rights to the land, confusion over which set of laws has primacy, or even a lack of knowledge of relevant laws, leave many of them at a significant disadvantage. Conflicting formal and informal land laws can also clog a country's legal system, making it prone to corruption. Such land reform efforts are most successful when pursued alongside complementary movements for racial justice and against the legacies of colonialism. Together these can ensure that reforms address not just competing legal systems but the underlying structures of dispossession and inequality.

Land reforms carried out in Japan, Taiwan and South Korea are credited with contributing to industrial development. The equitable distribution of land led to increasing agricultural outputs, high rural purchasing power and social mobility.

Additional challenges in land reform concern equity issues and potential elite capture of land, particularly regarding reforms focused on greater land formalization. If improperly or inadequately implemented, such reforms may further disadvantage marginalized groups such as indigenous communities or women. These concerns also lead to questions about the institutional capacity of governments to implement land reforms as they are designed. Even if a country does have this capacity, corruption and patrimonialism could lead to further elite capture. In Colombia, for example, the state transferred the rights of a large amount of public land to private owners over the past two centuries, with the aim to reduce rural poverty by giving land to those who do not own any. In areas with typically small and medium size farms, the land distribution reduced inequalities in ownership. However, in areas where members of a rural elite already owned much of the land, the new plots were also diverted into the large farms.

In looking at more radical reforms, such as large-scale land redistribution, critical views include concerns that redistributed land will not be used productively and that owners of expropriated land will not be compensated adequately or compensated at all. Zimbabwe is a commonly cited example of the perils of such large-scale reforms, whereby land redistribution contributed to economic decline and increased food insecurity in the country.

== Types ==
There are different types of land reform, including state-led agrarian reforms and market-led agrarian reforms.

State-led agrarian reforms are developed by national governments, which create programs and projects to carry out these initiatives. State-led reforms can take multiple forms. They may involve a one-time intervention by the state to create egalitarian ownership among peasants, or expropriation to establish collective agriculture. Their success varies across countries and political contexts.

Following the criticisms that state-led agrarian reforms received in the 20th century, and in the context of financial institutions' intervention, international institutions such as the World Bank proposed the development of market-led agrarian reforms. In these the market, through the buying and selling of land, regulates how land is distributed and drives the distribution of wealth. This strategy was put in place in countries such as Brazil, Colombia, and South Africa, among others, during the 1990s. Market-led agrarian reforms have been highly criticized, because they underestimate the power of large landlords and capitalist agribusiness and their economic capacity to deprive the poorest populations of land, thereby creating major problems of equity.

== National efforts ==
Land reform became a major policy issue worldwide after World War Ⅱ. From the 1950s to the 1970s, land reform initiatives figured prominently on the popular agenda in many countries. Debates on land reform were especially heated in the developing countries of the Global South, where it was closely linked to the attainment of national development goals. In this period, countries differed widely in how much land was redistributed by state-led land reforms and how many households benefited from these. The scale of land redistribution shows the extent to which land reform defined the politics of the time in many countries:

- Bolivia (1952-1977): Redistributed 74.5 percent of total agricultural land to 83.4 percent of all agricultural households.
- South Korea (since 1945): Redistributed 65 percent of total agricultural land to 77 percent of all agricultural households.
- Chile (1964-1973): Redistributed nearly 50 percent of total agricultural land to 20 percent of all agricultural households.
- Taiwan (1949-1953): Redistributed 48 percent of total agricultural land to 48 percent of all agricultural households.
- Peru (1963-1976): Redistributed 42.4 percent of total agricultural land to 32 percent of all agricultural households.
- Mexico: Redistributed 42.9 percent of total agricultural land to 43.4 percent of all agricultural households.
- Japan (since 1945): Redistributed one-third of total agricultural land to 70 percent of all agricultural households.
- Philippines (since 1972): Redistributed nearly half of total agricultural land to two-fifths of all agricultural households.
- El Salvador (1980-1990s): Redistributed 20 percent of total agricultural land to 12 percent of all agricultural households.
- Venezuela: Redistributed 19.3 percent of total agricultural land to 24.4 percent of all agricultural households.
- Egypt (1952-1961): Redistributed 10 percent of total agricultural land to 18.5 percent of all agricultural households.
- Costa Rica (1961-1979): Redistributed 7.1 percent of total agricultural land to 13.5 percent of all agricultural households.

== See also ==
- Adverse possession
- Agrarian Justice
- Certificate of occupancy
- Chinese Land Reform
- Citizen's Dividend
- Concentration of land ownership
- Economic rent
- Collectivization in the Soviet Union
- Common land
- Dekulakization
- Differential and absolute ground rent
- Eminent domain
- Enclosure
- Fachhochschule
- Freiwirtschaft
- Frente Unido de Reforma Agraria
- Gentrification
- Georgism (Henry George)
- Homestead principle
- Land banking
- Land claim
- Land consumption
- Land grabbing
- Land law
- Landlessness
- Landless Workers' Movement
- Land consolidation
- Land Reform in Developing Countries
- Land reforms by country
- Land tenure
- Land titling
- Land value tax
- Manorialism
- México Indígena
- Mutualism
- Natural capital
- Nonpossessory interest in land
- Profit (real property)
- Progress and Poverty
- Real estate appraisal
- Restitution
- Serfdom
- Settler
- Speculation
- Squatting
- Stolypin reform
- Usufruct
- Water scarcity
- Zapatismo
