= Irrigation in Bolivia =

- Land area: 1,084 km^{2}
- Agricultural land: 34%
- Cultivated area equipped for irrigation: 3.9%
- Irrigated area: ~226,500 ha
- Systems: Surface irrigation: 128,000 ha; Sprinkler irrigation: 300 ha
- Share of irrigated agriculture in GDP: 14% (2000–2004)
- Water sources for irrigation: Surface water
- Tariff: ~0.05 US$/m^{3}

Bolivia’s government considers irrigated agriculture as a major contributor to "better quality of life, rural and national development." After a period of social unrest caused by the privatization of water supply in Cochabamba and La Paz, the government of Evo Morales is undertaking a major institutional reform in the water resources management and particularly in the irrigation sector, aimed at: (i) including indigenous and rural communities in decision making, (ii) integrating technical and traditional knowledge on water resources management and irrigation, (iii) granting and registering water rights, (iv) increasing efficiency of irrigation infrastructure, (v) enhancing water quality, and (v) promoting necessary investment and financial sustainability in the sector. Bolivia is the first country in Latin America with a ministry dedicated exclusively to integrated water resources management: the Water Ministry.

== Impacts of irrigated agriculture on rural development ==
Bolivia is one of the poorest countries in Latin America. In 2006 the annual income per capita reached to 1,153 dollars and almost 40% of the population lived in extreme poverty. In addition, Bolivia is one of the most unequal countries in the continent with a Gini coefficient of about 0.6 and 10% of the population obtaining over 40% of the total income and indigenous and rural populations in particular suffering the effects of social and economic marginalization. Real per capita income has barely changed over the past fifty years, while increasing in 350% in Brazil, 200% in Chile and 75% in Argentina. Poverty in rural areas stands at 83 percent, compared to 54 percent urban areas, and there is an even greater gap in terms of unsatisfied basic needs (91 percent versus 39 percent). Despite recent improvements in living conditions nationwide, benefits have continued to accrue disproportionately to urban areas.

During the 2000-2004 period agriculture contributed an average of 14% to GDP and employed 40% of the population. However, in the rural area agriculture employs up to 80% of the population. In 2001, the agricultural sector generated US$432 million and 30% of national exports. According to the Irrigation Vice-Ministry, the agricultural sector in the eastern part of Bolivia generated US$2,160 million exporting soya, sunflower and sugarcane products. The agricultural sector of the western part of Bolivia is mostly focused on subsistence agriculture and local markets.

In addition, frequent government changes over the last five years and social tensions have undermined progress in poverty reduction. The Government of President Morales—Bolivia’s first indigenous President—who came into power in January 2006, has prepared a Plan Nacional de Desarrollo: Bolivia Digna, Soberana, Productiva y Democrática para Vivir Bien (PND).

Irrigation is a major component of the PND since it "plays a fundamental role in increasing agricultural production and diversification, rural employment, and food security in Bolivia" . Particularly, and according to the Water Ministry, irrigation contributes to rural development since it (i) decreases climatic risks providing water for ensure production; (ii) increases food security and supply to local and national markets; (iii) increases productivity generating export capacity and agricultural revenue; (iv) intensifies land use; (v) generates income and reduces migration; (vi) allows diversification of crops including high value cops; and (vii) generates productive investment.

== Irrigation development ==
=== Irrigation infrastructure ===
Bolivia has approximately 226,500 irrigated hectares (ha) or about 11% of the total agricultural land 2,100,000 ha. There are about 5,000 irrigation systems in Bolivia, most of them located in the South and Southwestern areas (Valles and Altiplano). These irrigation systems consist of rudimentary web of canals supplied by rainfall with few regulatory schemes such as dams, which makes them very vulnerable to seasonality of rain. Overall efficiency of irrigation systems varies from 18 to 30% in traditional systems to 35-50% in improved systems.

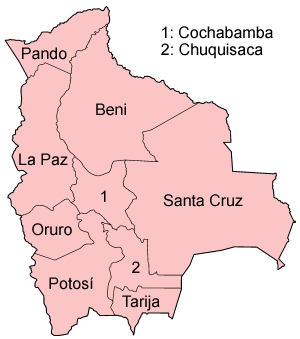
Map of the departments of Bolivia

Irrigation systems by Department, size and area

Department	Micro (10ha)	Small (100ha)	Medium (500ha)	Big (>500ha)	Total
Chuquisaca	1,653	11,370	4,261	3,884	21,168
Cochabamba	1,938	22,225	27,403	35,968	81,925
La Paz	1,703	21,047	6,052	7,192	35,994
Oruro	940	3,638	440	9,021	14,039
Potosí	3,240	10,146	2,254	600	16,240
Santa Cruz	269	5,456	8,434	1,080	15,239
Tarija	785	12,755	17,101	5,710	36,351
Total	10,528	86,638	65,944	63,454	226,564

Source: Ministerio del Agua

=== Linkages with water resources ===
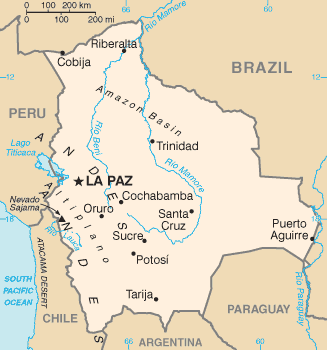
Map of Bolivia from the CIA World Factbook.

Irrigation accounts for 94% of water withdrawals or about 2,000 million cubic meters annually. Bolivia can be divided into three areas, which correspond to the eastern area (a tropical and subtropical region), the western area (the arid, semi arid and sub-humid dry region), and the Titicaca basin. The hydrographic system consists of three large basins: the Amazon Basin which measures approximately 724,000 km^{2} and covers 66% of Bolivia’s territory; the closed (endorheic) basin, which measures 145,081 km^{2} or 13% of the territory; and the Rio Plata Basin, which covers 229,500 km^{2} or 21% of the nation’s territory. The Amazon basin has a high flow of water and it is prone to floods. The quantity and quality of hydrological information is very poor.

=== Environmental impacts of irrigation ===
The main impacts of irrigated agriculture in Bolivia are soil erosion and pollution due to agricultural runoff. Nearly 41% of Bolivia’s national territory has lost its production capacity due to soil erosion. For example, in western regions of Oruro, Potosí and Tarija, close to 45,000 square kilometers have low soil productivity on account of erosion. The highland minifundios accelerate soil degradation processes. In the northern highlands, the production area of family agricultural production units is three to five hectares. Excess grazing and other agricultural activities have contributed to salinization and soil compression.

Agricultural runoff is one of the main contributors to water pollution in Bolivia, together with domestic municipal wastewater and dumping by industries and mines. The greatest percentage of the pollution load is due to diffuse dumping from agricultural and fishing activities and runoffs of urban areas. There are no regulations or controls over major dumping from non-specific sources, despite its volume and toxicity.

== History of the irrigation sector ==
=== Agricultural land past and present trends ===
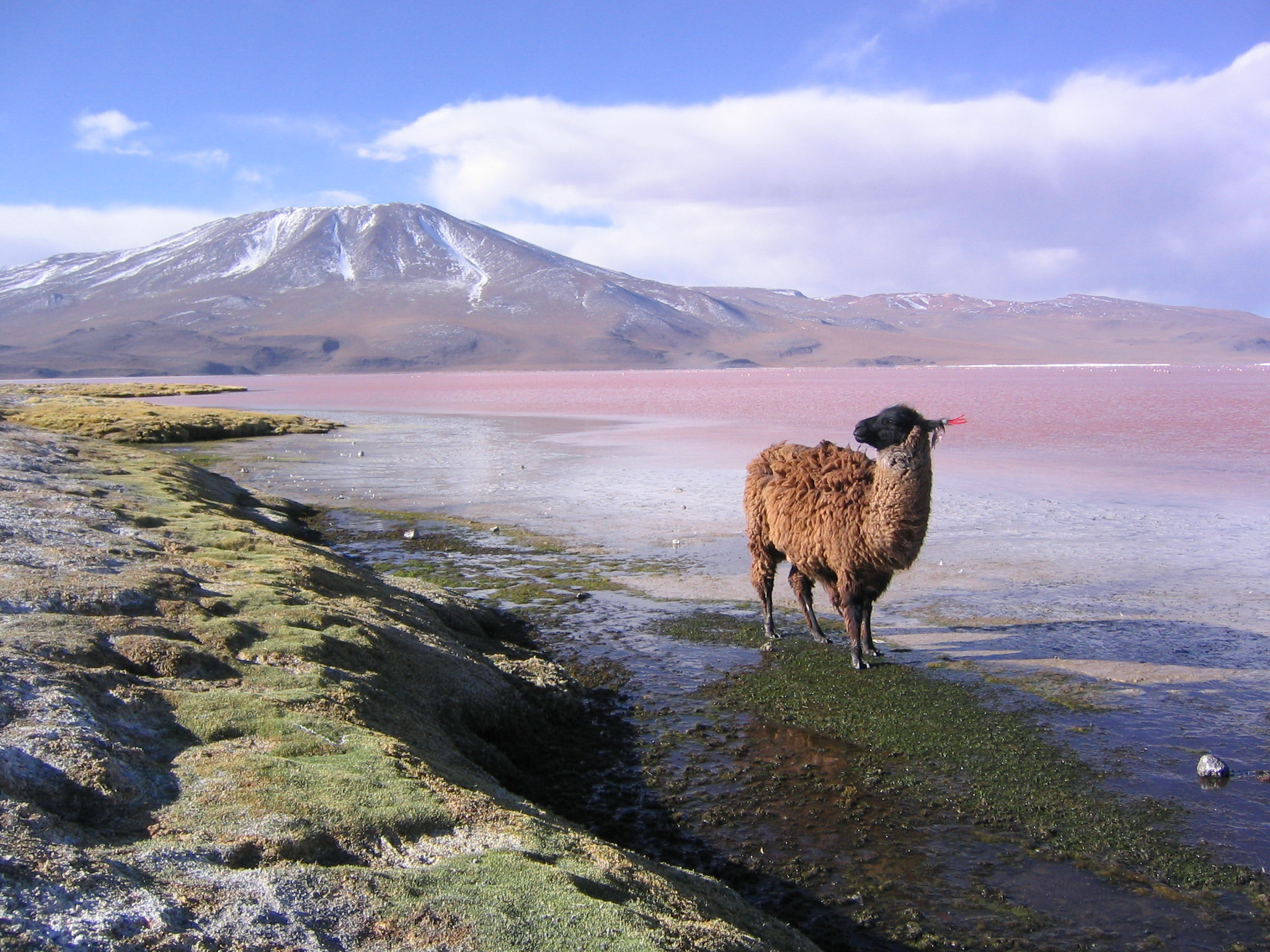
The llama is one of the icons of the Bolivian altiplano.

The Spanish colonists, soon after their arrival in the central Andes in the 16th century, appropriated the best farmlands on the coasts and valleys and pushed the indigenous population to the more inhospitable highlands. The highlands had been grazing grounds for llamas and alpacas, but had not been used for agriculture because of their low productivity and high climatic risks. Under the new circumstances, the highlands became the center of Bolivia’s subsistence agriculture.

Traditionally Bolivia has been dependent on the mining sector as a source of fiscal revenue and foreign exchange, and directed few resources towards the agricultural sector. Following the 1985 economic reform, the government of Paz Estenssoro aimed at moving towards a distortion-free market economy that would attract private investment to the agricultural sector. The World Bank considers that some of the reforms undertaken at that time were ill-informed, especially “the lack of constructive governmental intervention to provide needed public goods such as land titling, agricultural research and extension, and irrigation infrastructure.” As a result, the agricultural sector has lacked the underpinnings in both human and physical capital that facilitate development. The absence of new production and irrigation technologies left farmers with limited opportunities to raise their productivity and income discouraging investment. In 1999 the total area equipped for irrigation added up to 128,240ha. The irrigated area has almost doubled since. More than 50% of the irrigated area is concentrated in the provinces of Cochabamba and La Paz in the center of the country.

=== Institutional development ===
During the 1990s, water management was characterized by a sectoral approach with multitude of actors and legal approaches and overlapping of responsibilities. The Ministry of Rural Affairs and Indigenous People, the National Water Authority at the time, together with the Inter-Institutional Committee, the National Office for Irrigation and Drainage, and the National Secretary for Rural Development contributed to the mosaic of institutions in charge of water resources management for irrigation at the national level.

In 1998, the government approved a Resolution establishing the Water Intendancy as the authority for granting water user rights. In 1999, two major concessions for water and sanitation were granted to the private sector in La Paz and Cochabamba. The increase of water tariffs and the consequent limitation of access to water were followed with social upraising in 2000. After what is known as the "Water War," water user associations, national and municipal government, NGOs and international research organizations engaged on intense negotiations aimed at redefining public water policies. This process is known by the Project for Water Rights (Proyecto Derechos de Agua – PDA). Irrigation organizations worked with PDA in creating a national irrigation strategy combining both traditional irrigation practices with technical and scientific knowledge. This participatory process informed the 2004 Irrigation Law No.2878 among others.

Evo Morales administration is currently reforming the water institutional framework attributing competences to the newly created Environment and Water Resources Ministry as well as to municipalities and departments accordingly to the Decentralization Law No. 1654, and water users associations. The National Irrigation Plan has included as a challenge the still overlapping responsibilities of different institutions at the national and local level. (See institutional framework below)

== Legal and institutional framework ==
=== Legal framework ===
The 2004 Irrigation Law No. 2878 aims at managing irrigation water resources through a decentralized institutional framework as well as securing water user rights through registration. The Irrigation Law 2878 also transfers operation and maintenance of irrigation infrastructure to local farmers and establish participatory mechanisms to promote investment on irrigation systems. The previous law dated from 1906 and was considered obsolete. through

The Irrigation Law specifically prohibits the transferring of water rights, hence the creation of water markets, and gives priority to collective users rights over individual users. Users are granted water rights through registries or authorizations. Registries are granted to the indigenous and local families or communities and are aimed at securing water access for domestic or traditional agriculture use respectively. Authorizations are granted to other farmer organizations for agricultural or agro-forestry use for a maximum of 40 years.

The Irrigation Law recognizes the Water Ministry, previous Ministry for Agriculture and Campesino Issues, as the national water authority and created the National Irrigation Service (Servicio Nacional de Riego – SENARI) and the Local Irrigation Service (Servicio Departamental de Riego – SEDERI).

=== Institutional framework ===
The Environment and Water Resources Ministry, created in 2009, is responsible for: (i) planning, implementing, monitoring, evaluating, and funding irrigation plans and policies in close collaboration with SENARI;(ii) managing national and international funds aimed at irrigation development;(iii) promote technical assistance, capacity building and applied research and development in irrigation; and (iv) promote participative decentralization in irrigation development at the departmental, prefectural, municipal, local and river basin level as established in Law 2878. The Ministry for Rural Development, Agriculture and Environment share the same responsibilities than the Water Ministry.

The Vice-Ministry for Irrigation aims at: (i) guaranteeing sustainable water use for irrigation through a comprehensive system for granting water rights and permits (ii) promoting national and local investments, and (iii) strengthening institutional capacity through technical and financial support.

The Ministry of Development Planning, together with the Water Ministry and the Ministry for Rural Development, Agriculture and Environment aims at: (i) planning and supervising water management at the river basin level, (ii) designing and implementation of environmental standards for irrigation works, (iii) monitoring water quality and mitigating water pollution.

SENARI, under the Water Ministry, is responsible for planning and implementing water policies, granting water rights, conflict resolution, and coordinate with other water stakeholders and well as supervise SEDERI. SEDERIs, branches of SENARI at the level of departments, are responsible for proposing departmental irrigation strategies, supervising the Departmental Irrigation Service, promoting capacity building among water users, and updating the irrigation registry at the department level. There are currently seven SEDERIs in the departments of Chuquisaca, Cochabamba, La Paz, Oruro, Potosi, Santa Cruz and Tarija.

There are multiple irrigation and water users associations at the local, regional, river basing and departmental level, comprising associations, cooperatives, committees and communities more or less formal. The government through the new Water Law is aiming at promoting registration of informal associations in the process of receiving water user rights. Irrigation associations are organized at the national level through the National Association of Irrigators and Local Water System, and at the Departmental level through Departmental Irrigation Units (Unidades Departamentales de Riego - UDR) and Departmental Irrigators Associations (Asociaciones Departamentales de Regantes - ADR).

=== Government strategy for the irrigation sector ===
Evo Morales’ administration is aiming at transforming the irrigation sector focusing on participatory decision-making and integrated water resources management at the river basin level with a strong emphasis on public investment.

In July 2007, Bolivia’s government approved a new National Irrigation Plan, called the "new PRONAR". to be implemented from 2007 to 2030. The preceding National Irrigation program, also called PRONAR, was approved in 1996 and was implemented until 2005. The new PRONAR consist of five major components: (i)support agricultural and forestry production, (ii) support water resources management, (iii) strengthen institutional framework capacities, (iv)increase investment on irrigation and drainage infrastructure, and (v)integral technical assistance, capacity building and research. PRONAR aims at building irrigation infrastructure on 275,000 ha, benefiting 200,000 farmers, with a total investment of US$1.2 billion by 2030.

=== Key Legal Issues that Arise in Irrigation PPPs ===
There are a number of legal and commercial issues that will affect how these projects move forward and are structured. Whilst some of the legal issues are not confined to irrigation PPPs they can take on a new dimension and complexity when applied to irrigation: Land ownership; water extraction; public sector counterpart. These will be key issues in a PPP as the private provider will want to ensure a steady revenue stream.

There are also the usual legal considerations that need to be checked when developing PPPs in any sector, such as legal restrictions on the type of PPP arrangement that can be entered into, relevant procurement rules for entering into PPPs, existence of restrictions on foreign investment, taxation and potential for tax holidays and the ability to assign rights such as security and step in rights to lenders.

== Water tariff and cost recovery ==
Farmers contribute to operational and maintenance costs of irrigation infrastructure both in cash and kind. The Water Ministry estimates that water users contribute with cash to cover maintenance costs in 45% irrigation systems. Irrigation systems such as Guadalupe and Pampa Redonda in Santa Cruz and Chiara in Cochabamba, a total of 10% of all irrigation systems, received any payment for operation costs.

For example, in Cochabamba users pay approximately US$4.1 application fee and US$9.6 registration fee. Users pay O&M costs through a day of work or a US$2.7 fine per day of work.

== Investment and financing ==
In irrigation, there is trend of increasing investment in irrigation, from 132.7 UDS millions in 2001 invested in rural development (including irrigation) to 168.3 USD million in 2002. A large part of these investments were made through Municipal governments building systems and transferring them to the communities, though in most of the cases there is no clarity about who actually finally owns those systems.

Regarding particular irrigation projects, PRONAR implemented 158 projects from 1996 to 2005, in seven out of the nine departments of Bolivia, investing US$20 million in close collaboration with the Inter American Development Bank, irrigation associations, and municipal governments.

Irrigation Investment by department and source

Department	Projects	Municipalities	Farmers	Irrigated Ha	BID/PRONAR Investment (US$)	Local Investment (US$)	Total
Cochabamba	20	16	3,210	1,983	2,365,141	626,798	2,991,939
Chuquisaca	34	16	1,612	2,367	2,719,142	780,009	3,499,151
La Paz	32	19	3,077	4,584	3, 201,460	979,723	4, 181,183
Oruro	26	7	1,326	1,885	1, 740,746	548,554	2, 289,300
Potosi	12	4	1,300	706	1, 047,322	359,058	1, 406, 380
Santa Cruz	9	8	554	699	912,185	265,932	1, 1778,117
Tarija	25	13	1,477	2,170	2, 727,255	897, 336	3, 624,590
Total	158	84	12, 556	14,396	14, 713,249	4, 457,412	19, 170,661

Source: Ministerio de Asuntos Campesinos y Agropecuarios (2005)

== Possible climate change impacts on irrigated agriculture ==
Although specific impacts of Climate Change on irrigation in Bolivia are still unknown, phenomena such as a high intensity El Nino in the form of floods, droughts, frost and hail are generally expected to affect Bolivia. Natural disasters directly affect the country’s development, because it hurts its economic results, weaken its social well-being, cause capital losses, and damage the roads and energy and irrigation infrastructure. Such losses, in turn, influence economic indicators such as inflation and production, which in turn increase poverty

Floods and landslides in the rainy season affect a wide range of infrastructure. Landslides in 1997 and 1998 in the communities of Cotahuma, Mokotor, and the Kunii area, in the department of La Paz, caused 24 deaths and destroyed 264 homes. An unprecedented hail storm in 2002 also in La Paz caused 70 deaths and damage was estimated at more than US$70 million. Droughts often recur, their area of incidence is quite large, and they are a major cause of migration from the countryside to the cities.

In addition, increase of temperatures in the Andes and the melting of glaciers may increase seasonal runoff in the short term and increase agricultural dependency on annual rainfall in the medium and long term. For example, Bolivia’s Chacaltaya glacier, situated 20 km NE of the city of La Paz, has lost 82% of its surface area since 1982 and may completely melt by 2013. (See Impacts of Glacier Retreat in the Andes:Documentary)

== External cooperation ==
The World Bank is currently undertaken a US 78.1 million Second Participatory Rural Investment Project with the objective of piloting the consolidation of institutional arrangements between the national, prefecture and municipal governments and civil society for sustainable management of sub-national public investment in irrigated agriculture, forestry and fishing with an emphasis on territorial development. The World Bank is also supporting with US$12.5 million the implementation of the National Plan for Sustainable Rehabilitation and Reconstruction (PRRES), thought the Bolivia Emergency Recovery and Disaster Management Project aimed at strengthening the national system for risk management and rehabilitation, reconstruction, and small mitigation works. These works will be financed in specific areas determined to have been particularly affected by El Nino in the past.

The Inter American Development Bank is currently financing a US$270,000 "Evaluation and Design of Irrigation Project" to evaluating the irrigation systems in operation. The IDB together with the GTZ provided technical and financial assistance to Bolivia’s government in the implementation of a National Irrigation Plan, PRONAR that finalized in 2005. This evaluation is the groundwork for further collaboration among IDB and the Bolivia’s government.

== Lessons learned from Bolivia’s PRONAR ==
The Water Ministry identified a number of lessons learned from the evaluation of PRONAR from 1996 to 2005. Some of the key aspects are:

- Infrastructure With PRONAR infrastructure was designed based on irrigation water requirements and water availability. It is necessary to also incorporate social, hydrological and topographical data when designing irrigation infrastructure to avoid technical problems during implementation. It is also necessary having strong local institutions able to manage and monitor implementation of irrigations works.
- Legal framework A well defined legal framework defining sectoral policy regarding public investment in private irrigation systems is crucial especially determining responsibility of operation and maintenance of public funded irrigation infrastructure.
- Economic impact of irrigation investment Irrigated agriculture has a major economic impact when it is applied to high value crops and farmers have a connection with a local or national markets. The connection with local or national markets is determined by access to transportation.
