= Customary land =

Communally owned indigenous land

Customary land is land held under customary land tenure and the enjoyment of some use of land that arises through customary, unwritten practice rather than through written codified law. It is the tenure usually associated with indigenous communities and administered in accordance with their customs, as opposed to statutory tenure usually introduced during the colonial period.

Since the late 20th century, statutory recognition and protection of indigenous and community land rights continues to be a major challenge. The gap between formally recognized and customarily held and managed land is a significant source of underdevelopment, conflict, and environmental degradation. Many international development organizations, such as the World Bank, have embraced ideas about the benefits of formalizing land rights. This has translated into a number of development programs that work with governments and civil society organizations to initiate and implement land reforms. However, opinions are divided about whether formalizing land rights is one-size-fits-all strategy that necessarily empowers the poor. For example, in Sub-Saharan Africa, where land registration and titling are advocated by various groups as a pro-poor strategy, there are often multiple, conflicting claims to the same land by different individuals or groups. This means that formalizing land rights would benefit some groups more than others and create tensions. Such land reform efforts are most successful when pursued alongside complementary movements for racial justice and against the legacies of colonialism. Together these can ensure that reforms address not just competing legal systems but the underlying structures of dispossession and inequality.

In many countries, most land is held under customary tenure, including 90% in Africa.

In the Malawi Land Act of 1965, "Customary Land" is defined as "all land which is held, occupied or used under customary law, but does not include any public land".

In most countries of the Pacific islands, customary land remains the dominant land tenure form. Distinct customary systems of tenure have evolved on different islands and areas within the Pacific region. In any country there may be many different types of customary tenure. The amount of customary land ownership out of the total land area of Pacific island nations is the following: 97% in Papua New Guinea, 98% in Vanuatu, 88% in Fiji, 87% in the Solomon Islands, and 81% in Samoa.

== See also ==
- Aboriginal title
- Indigenous land rights
- Indigenous peoples
