= Indo-1 =

Chemical compound used as an indicator in calcium imaging

Names
- IUPAC name 2-[4-(bis(carboxymethyl)amino)-3-[2-[2-(bis(carboxymethyl)amino)- 5-methylphenoxy]ethoxy]phenyl]-1H-indole-6-carboxylic acid
- Other names Indo-1

Identifiers
CAS Number	96314-96-4
3D model (JSmol)	Interactive image
ChEBI	CHEBI:52084
ChemSpider	94791
PubChem CID	105060
UNII	N18RMK75W1
CompTox Dashboard (EPA)	DTXSID60242202
- InChI: InChI=1S/C32H31N3O12/c1-18-2-6-24(34(14-28(36)37)15-29(38)39)26(10-18)46-8-9-47-27-13-20(5-7-25(27)35(16-30(40)41)17-31(42)43)22-11-19-3-4-21(32(44)45)12-23(19)33-22/h2-7,10-13,33H,8-9,14-17H2,1H3,(H,36,37)(H,38,39)(H,40,41)(H,42,43)(H,44,45) Key: AMHAQOBUZCQMHN-UHFFFAOYSA-N; InChI=1/C32H31N3O12/c1-18-2-6-24(34(14-28(36)37)15-29(38)39)26(10-18)46-8-9-47-27-13-20(5-7-25(27)35(16-30(40)41)17-31(42)43)22-11-19-3-4-21(32(44)45)12-23(19)33-22/h2-7,10-13,33H,8-9,14-17H2,1H3,(H,36,37)(H,38,39)(H,40,41)(H,42,43)(H,44,45) Key: AMHAQOBUZCQMHN-UHFFFAOYAU
- SMILES: O=C(O)CN(c4ccc(cc4OCCOc3c(N(CC(=O)O)CC(=O)O)ccc(c2cc1ccc(cc1[nH]2)C(=O)O)c3)C)CC(=O)O

Properties
Chemical formula	C_{32}H_{31}N_{3}O_{12}
Molar mass	649.60 g/mol
- Except where otherwise noted, data are given for materials in their standard state (at 25 °C [77 °F], 100 kPa). verify (what is ?) Infobox references

Indo-1 is a popular dye that is used as a ratiometric calcium indicator similar to Fura-2. In contrast to Fura-2, Indo-1 has a dual emissions peak and a single excitation. The main emission peak in calcium-free solution is 475 nm while in the presence of calcium the emission is shifted to 400 nm. It is widely used in flow cytometry and laser scanning microscopy, due to its single excitation property. However, its use for confocal microscopy is limited due to its photo-instability caused by photobleaching. Indo-1 is also able to keep possession of its ratiometric emission, dissimilar to Fura-2. The penta potassium salt is commercially available and preferred to the free acid because of its higher solubility in water. While Indo-1 is not cell permeable the penta acetoxymethyl ester Indo-1 AM enters the cell where it is cleaved by intracellular esterases to Indo-1. The synthesis and properties of Indo-1 were presented in 1985 by the group of Roger Y Tsien.

In intact heart muscle, Indo-1, in combination with bioluminescent protein aequorin, can be utilized as a tool to distinguish between the internal and exterior inotropic regulation processes.
