= GCaMP =

Genetically encoded calcium indicator

GCaMP is a genetically encoded calcium indicator (GECI) initially developed in 2001 by Junichi Nakai. It is a synthetic fusion of green fluorescent protein (GFP), calmodulin (CaM), and M13, a peptide sequence from myosin light-chain kinase. When bound to Ca^{2+}, GCaMP fluoresces green with a peak excitation wavelength of 480 nm and a peak emission wavelength of 510 nm. It is used in biological research to measure intracellular Ca^{2+} levels both in vitro and in vivo using virally transfected or transgenic cell and animal lines. The genetic sequence encoding GCaMP can be inserted under the control of promoters exclusive to certain cell types, allowing for cell-type specific expression of GCaMP. Since Ca^{2+} is a second messenger that contributes to many cellular mechanisms and signaling pathways, GCaMP allows researchers to quantify the activity of Ca^{2+}-based mechanisms and study the role of Ca^{2+} ions in biological processes of interest.

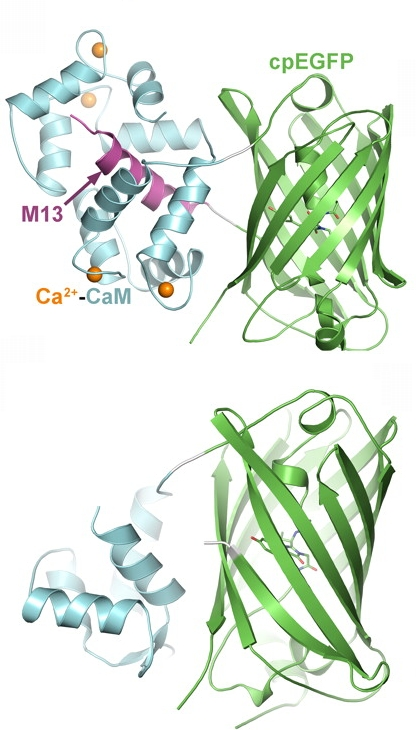
GCaMP bound to Ca^{2+} (top) and unbound (bottom)

== Structure ==
GCaMP consists of three key domains: an M13 domain at the N-terminus, a calmodulin (CaM) domain at the C-terminus, and a GFP domain in the center. The GFP domain is circularly permuted such that the native N- and C-termini are fused together by a six-amino-acid linking sequence, and the GFP sequence is split in the middle, creating new N- and C-termini that connect to the M13 and CaM domains.

In the absence of Ca^{2+}, the GFP chromophore is exposed to water and exists in a protonated state with minimal fluorescence intensity. Upon Ca^{2+} binding, the CaM domain undergoes a conformational change and tightly binds to the M13 domain alpha helix, preventing water molecules from accessing the chromophore. As a result, the chromophore rapidly deprotonates and converts into an anionic form that fluoresces brightly, similar to native GFP.

== History and development ==
In 2001, Nakai et al. reported the development of GCaMP1 as a Ca^{2+} probe with improved signal-to-noise ratio compared to previously developed fluorescent Ca^{2+} probes. The first transgenic mouse expressing GCaMP1 was reported in 2004. However, at 37 ˚C (physiological temperature in mammals), GCaMP1 did not fold stably or fluoresce, limiting its potential use as a calcium indicator in vivo.

In 2006, Tallini et al. subsequently reported the improvement of GCaMP1 to GCaMP2, which exhibited brighter fluorescence than GCaMP1 and greater stability at mammalian body temperatures. Tallini et al. expressed GCaMP2 in cardiomyocytes in mouse embryos to perform the first in vivo GCaMP imaging of Ca^{2+} in mammals.

Further modifications of GCaMP, including GCaMP3, GCaMP5, GCaMP6, and jGCaMP7, have been developed to progressively improve the signal, sensitivity, and dynamic range of Ca^{2+} detection, with recent versions exhibiting fluorescence similar to native GFP.

=== Variants in use ===
Both slow variants (GCaMP6s, jGCaMP7s) and fast variants (GCaMP6f, jGCaMP7f) are used in biological and neuroscience research. The slow variants are brighter and more sensitive to small changes in Ca^{2+} levels, such as single action potentials; on the other hand, the fast variants are less sensitive but respond more quickly, making them useful for tracking changes in Ca^{2+} levels over precise timescales. GCaMP6 also has a medium variant, GCaMP6m, whose kinetics are intermediate between GCaMP6s and GCaMP6f. Other variants of jGCaMP7 are also employed: jGCaMP7b exhibits bright baseline fluorescence and is used for imaging dendrites and axons, while jGCaMP7c exhibits greater contrast between maximal and baseline fluorescence and is advantageous for imaging large populations of neurons.

In 2018, Yang et al. reported the development of GCaMP-X, generated by the addition of a calmodulin-binding motif. Since the GCaMP calmodulin domain, when unbound, disrupts L-type calcium channel gating, the added calmodulin-binding motif prevents GCaMP-X from interfering with calcium-dependent signaling mechanisms.

In 2020, Zhang et al. reported the development of jGCaMP8, including sensitive, medium, and fast variants, which exhibit faster kinetics and greater sensitivity than the corresponding jGCaMP7 variants.

Red fluorescent indicators have also been developed: jRCaMP1a and jRCaMP1b use a circular permutation of the red fluorescent protein mRuby instead of GFP, while jRGECO1a is based on the red fluorescent protein mApple. Since the blue light used to excite GCaMP is scattered by tissue and the emitted green light is absorbed by blood, red fluorescent indicators provide more penetration and imaging depth in vivo than GCaMP. Use of red fluorescent indicators also avoids the photodamage caused by blue excitation light. Moreover, red fluorescent indicators allow for concurrent use of optogenetics, which is difficult with GCaMP because the excitation wavelengths of GCaMP overlap with those of channelrhodopsin-2 (ChR2). Simultaneous use of red and green GECIs can provide two-color visualization of different subcellular regions or cell populations.

== Applications in research ==
=== Neuronal activity ===
In neurons, action potentials induce neurotransmitter release at axon terminals by opening voltage-gated Ca^{2+} channels, allowing for Ca^{2+} influx. As a result, GCaMP is commonly used to measure increases in intracellular Ca^{2+} in neurons as a proxy for neuronal activity in multiple animal models, including Caenorhabditis elegans, zebrafish, Drosophila, rats and mice. Recently, genetically encoded voltage indicators (GEVIs) have been developed alongside GECIs to more directly probe neuronal activity at the cellular level in these animal models.

GCaMP has played a vital role in establishing large-scale neural recordings in animals to investigate how activity patterns in neuronal networks influence behavior. For example, Nguyen et al. (2016) used GCaMP in whole-brain imaging during free movement of C. elegans to identify neurons and groups of neurons whose activity correlated with specific locomotor behaviors.

Muto et al. (2003) expressed GCaMP in zebrafish embryos to measure and map the coordinated activity of spinal motor neurons to different parts of the brain during the onset, propagation, and recovery of seizures induced by pentylenetetrazol. GCaMP expression in zebrafish brains has also been used to study activation of neural circuits in cognitive processes like prey capture, impulse control, and attention.

Additionally, researchers have used GCaMP to observe neuronal activity in mice by expressing it under control of the Thy1 promoter, which is found in excitatory pyramidal neurons. For instance, integration of neurons into circuits during motor learning has been tracked by using GCaMP to observe synchronized fluctuation patterns in Ca^{2+} levels. GCaMP has also been used to observe Ca^{2+} dynamics in subcellular compartments of mouse neurons: Cichon and Gan (2015) used GCaMP to show that neurons in the mouse motor cortex exhibit NMDA-driven increases in Ca^{2+} that are independent for each dendritic spine, thus showing that individual dendritic spines regulate synaptic plasticity. Finally, GCaMP has been used to identify activity patterns in specific regions of the mouse brain. For instance, Jones et al. (2018) used GCaMP6 in mice to measure neuronal activity in the suprachiasmatic nucleus (SCN), the mammalian circadian pacemaker, and showed that SCN neurons that produced vasoactive intestinal peptide (VIP) exhibited daily activity rhythms in vivo that correlated with VIP release.

GCaMP has also been combined with fiber photometry to measure population-level Ca^{2+} changes within subpopulations of neurons in freely moving animals. For instance, Clarkson et al. (2017) used this method to show that neurons in the arcuate nucleus of the hypothalamus synchronize to increases in Ca^{2+} immediately prior to pulses of luteinizing hormone (LH). While GCaMP imaging with fiber photometry cannot track changes in Ca^{2+} levels within individual neurons, it provides greater temporal resolution for large-scale changes.

=== Cardiac conduction ===
Ca^{2+} currents through cardiomyocyte gap junctions mediate synchronized contraction of cardiac tissue. As a result, GCaMP expression in cardiomyocytes, both in vitro and in vivo, has been used to study Ca^{2+}-influx-dependent excitation and contraction in zebrafish and mice. For instance, Tallini et al. (2006) expressed GCaMP2 in mouse embryos to show that, at embryonic day 10.5, electrical conduction was rapid in the atria and ventricles but slow in the atrioventricular canal. Chi et al. (2008) used a transgenic cardiac-specific GCaMP zebrafish line to image cardiomyocyte activation throughout the cardiac cycle; from their results, they characterized four developmental stages of the zebrafish cardiac conduction system and identified 17 novel mutations affecting cardiac conduction. However, uncontrolled expression of GCaMP leads to cardiac hypertrophy due to overexpression of the calmodulin motif, which interferes with intracellular calcium signaling. As a result, experiments using cardiac tissue should carefully control the level of GCaMP expression.

=== Signaling pathway activation ===
Since Ca^{2+} is a common second messenger, GCaMP has been used to monitor the activation of signaling pathways. For instance, Bonder and McCarthy (2014) used GCaMP to show that astrocytic G-protein coupled receptor (GPCR) signaling and subsequent Ca^{2+} release was not responsible for neurovascular coupling, the process by which changes in neuronal activity lead to changes in local blood flow. Similarly, Greer and Bear et al. (2016) used GCaMP to characterize the dynamics of Ca^{2+} influx in necklace olfactory neuron signaling, which uses transmembrane MS4A proteins as chemoreceptors.

== See also ==
- Calcium imaging
- Calcium in biology
- Calmodulin
- Cameleon (protein)
- Green fluorescent protein
- Myosin light-chain kinase
