= Fura-2-acetoxymethyl ester =

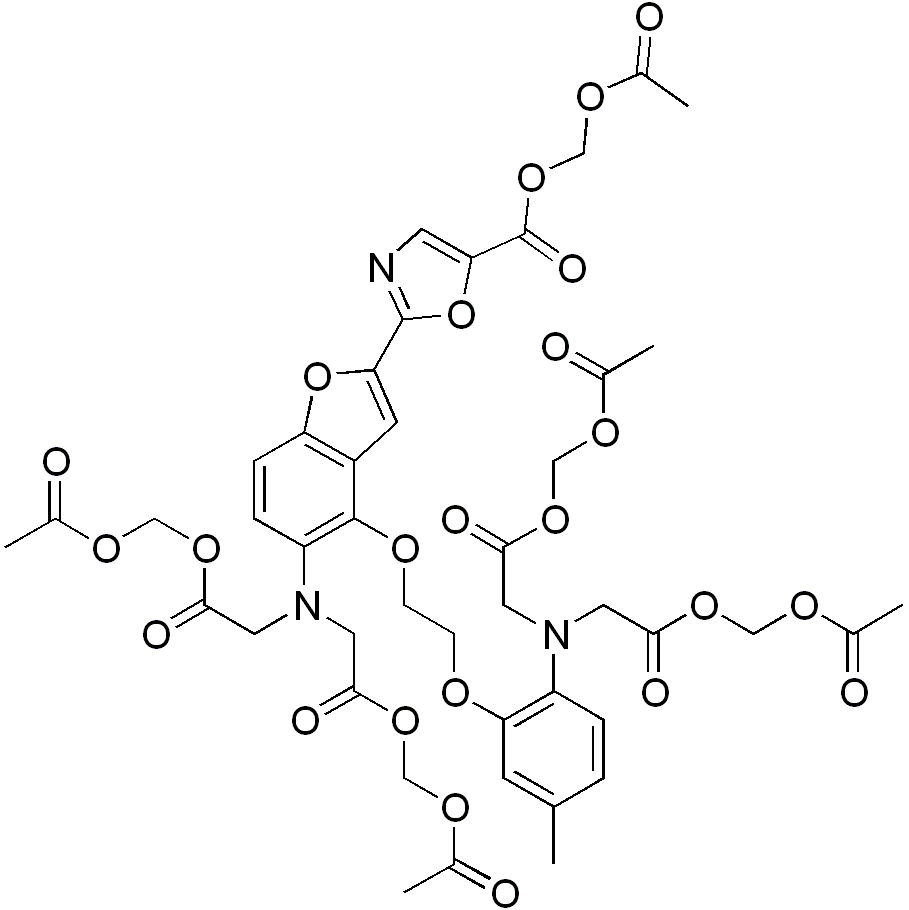

Names
- Preferred IUPAC name (Acetyloxy)methyl 2-(5-{2-[5-methyl-2-(2,6,10,14-tetraoxo-3,5,11,13-tetraoxa-8-azapentadecan-8-yl)phenoxy]ethoxy}-6-(2,6,10,14-tetraoxo-3,5,11,13-tetraoxa-8-azapentadecan-8-yl)-1-benzofuran-2-yl)-1,3-oxazole-5-carboxylate
- Other names Fura-2AM

Identifiers
| CAS Number | 108964-32-5 |
| 3D model (JSmol) | Interactive image |
| ChemSpider | 2610364 |
| PubChem CID | 3364574 |
| UNII | Z597XP8YFR |
| CompTox Dashboard (EPA) | DTXSID50148784 |
- InChI: InChI=1S/C44H47N3O24/c1-25-7-8-32(46(16-39(53)65-20-60-26(2)48)17-40(54)66-21-61-27(3)49)35(11-25)58-9-10-59-36-12-31-13-37(43-45-15-38(71-43)44(57)69-24-64-30(6)52)70-34(31)14-33(36)47(18-41(55)67-22-62-28(4)50)19-42(56)68-23-63-29(5)51/h7-8,11-15H,9-10,16-24H2,1-6H3 Key: VPSRLGDRGCKUTK-UHFFFAOYSA-N; InChI=1/C44H47N3O24/c1-25-7-8-32(46(16-39(53)65-20-60-26(2)48)17-40(54)66-21-61-27(3)49)35(11-25)58-9-10-59-36-12-31-13-37(43-45-15-38(71-43)44(57)69-24-64-30(6)52)70-34(31)14-33(36)47(18-41(55)67-22-62-28(4)50)19-42(56)68-23-63-29(5)51/h7-8,11-15H,9-10,16-24H2,1-6H3 Key: VPSRLGDRGCKUTK-UHFFFAOYAI
- SMILES: O=C(OCOC(=O)CN(c4ccc(cc4OCCOc3cc1c(oc(c1)c2ncc(o2)C(=O)OCOC(=O)C)cc3N(CC(=O)OCOC(=O)C)CC(=O)OCOC(=O)C)C)CC(=O)OCOC(=O)C)C

Properties
| Chemical formula | C_{44}H_{47}N_{3}O_{24} |
| Molar mass | 1001.85 |
- Except where otherwise noted, data are given for materials in their standard state (at 25 °C [77 °F], 100 kPa). verify (what is ?) Infobox references

Fura-2-acetoxymethyl ester, often abbreviated Fura-2AM, is a man-made membrane-permeant derivative of the ratiometric calcium indicator Fura-2 used in the biochemistry laboratory to measure cellular calcium concentrations by fluorescence. When added to cells, Fura-2AM crosses cell membranes and once inside the cell, the acetoxymethyl groups are removed by cellular esterases. Removal of the acetoxymethyl esters regenerates "Fura-2", the pentacarboxylate calcium indicator. Measurement of Ca^{2+}-induced fluorescence at both 340 nm and 380 nm allows for calculation of calcium concentrations based 340/380 ratios. The equation to complete these calculations is as follows:

R_{n} = 100 x (R-R_{0})/(R_{max}-R_{0})

This equation is essential for calculating the normalized intensity ratio, which analyzes the fluorescence emissions from the Fura-2AM. R_{max} and R_{0} are the maximum ratio and averaged ratio respectively. The use of the ratio automatically cancels out certain variables such as local differences in Fura-2AM concentration or cell thickness that would otherwise lead to artifacts when attempting to image calcium concentrations in cells. This is supported through the utilization of a kymograph, which creates a spatiotemporal map of the intensity ratios comparing the inside and outside of the cell; different regions of a cell are evaluated for calcium ion changes and the change along a specific axis is focused on, therefore, the thickness of the cellular membrane becomes a negligible factor. However, the location of the calcium becomes significant when discussing the mechanism of calcium removal. The concentration of calcium closer to the center of the cell is faster than the concentration of calcium near the membrane of the cell; this provides insight on the characteristics of calcium and its function within the cell's space.

The utilization of Fura-2-acetoxymethyl ester is critical in research about the cardiovascular system, nervous system, and immune system. These body systems hold value in the exchange of the calcium ion, and its critical to utilize the proper molecule to measure that ion flow. Fura-2AM was designed to be used throughout different body systems to watch active calcium level changes while the organism is alive and functioning. Since an organism being studied may be evaluated for different neuronal, cardiac, and immune conditions, it is critical for Fura-2AM to not induce toxicity when introduced to somatic cells. Scientists created the compound to have a strict and selective affinity for only calcium ions, therefore, when introduced to an active cell, it does not disrupt metabolic pathways since it cannot physically bind to anything else. Additionally, Fura-2AM is resistant to chemotaxis and the dynamic nature of the cell. In the context of the inflammatory response, while neutrophils and other immune cells move in and out of the site of interest, the calcium ion readings remain accurate and the same as if the cells were stable and immobile. Regardless of a particular neutrophil moving or changing shape, Fura-2AM can still conclude an accurate reading regarding calcium influx. Overall, Fura-2-acetoxymethyl ester is a critical laboratory compound that is necessary for use when evaluating the concentration of calcium during critical bodily functions like muscle contractions (including, but not limited to, cardiac muscle), ion-gated channels (including, but not limited to, the ones in the brain), and the inflammatory response.
