= Frente Unido de Reforma Agraria =

Frente Unido de Reforma Agraria ('United Front for Land Reform', abbreviated FURA) was a coalition of popular movements in Ecuador, formed in 1972 to struggle for the implementation of land reform. FURA consisted of FENOC, ACAL, FTAL, ACAE and ECUARUNARI.

FURA mobilizes various public protests and peasant congresses. The first protest march was organized in Guayaquil in 1972. In 1973 FURA marches gathered 50,000 people in Guayaquil (organized on June 6, 1973), 15,000 people in Cuenca and 5,000 people in Quito.

FURA argued in favour of returning lands to peasant communities, assistance to farming cooperatives, ending feudal labour relations, increases in salaries and technical assistance.

The movement organized the 'First National Peasant Meeting for Land Reform' in Quito, which demanded the implementation of radical and genuine land reform. In October 1973 a Land Reform Law was promulgated by General Guillermo Rodríguez Lara, partially fulfilling the demands of FURA. FURA fell apart soon afterwards, due to political differences in the coalition.
