= Fluo-3 =

Names
- Preferred IUPAC name 2,2′-{[2-(2-{2-[Bis(carboxymethyl)amino]-5-(2,7-dichloro-6-hydroxy-3-oxo-3H-xanthen-9-yl)phenoxy}ethoxy)-4-methylphenyl]azanediyl}diacetic acid

Identifiers
CAS Number	123632-39-3
3D model (JSmol)	Interactive image
ChEMBL	ChEMBL509919
ChemSpider	94730
PubChem CID	104978
UNII	23D4W0B50Y
CompTox Dashboard (EPA)	DTXSID40923941
- InChI: InChI=1S/C36H30Cl2N2O13/c1-18-2-4-24(39(14-32(43)44)15-33(45)46)30(8-18)51-6-7-52-31-9-19(3-5-25(31)40(16-34(47)48)17-35(49)50)36-20-10-22(37)26(41)12-28(20)53-29-13-27(42)23(38)11-21(29)36/h2-5,8-13,41H,6-7,14-17H2,1H3,(H,43,44)(H,45,46)(H,47,48)(H,49,50) Key: OZLGRUXZXMRXGP-UHFFFAOYSA-N; InChI=1/C36H30Cl2N2O13/c1-18-2-4-24(39(14-32(43)44)15-33(45)46)30(8-18)51-6-7-52-31-9-19(3-5-25(31)40(16-34(47)48)17-35(49)50)36-20-10-22(37)26(41)12-28(20)53-29-13-27(42)23(38)11-21(29)36/h2-5,8-13,41H,6-7,14-17H2,1H3,(H,43,44)(H,45,46)(H,47,48)(H,49,50) Key: OZLGRUXZXMRXGP-UHFFFAOYAI
- SMILES: O=C(O)CN(c5ccc(cc5OCCOc4c(N(CC(=O)O)CC(=O)O)ccc(C=1c3c(OC=2C=1\C=C(\Cl)C(=O)C=2)cc(O)c(Cl)c3)c4)C)CC(=O)O

Properties
Chemical formula	C_{36}H_{30}Cl_{2}N_{2}O_{13}
Molar mass	769.54 g·mol^{−1}
- Except where otherwise noted, data are given for materials in their standard state (at 25 °C [77 °F], 100 kPa). Infobox references

Fluo-3 is a fluorescence indicator of intracellular calcium (Ca^{2+}), developed by Roger Y. Tsien. It is used to measure Ca^{2+} inside living cells in flow cytometry, and confocal laser scanning microscopy using visible light excitation (compatible with argon laser sources operating at 488 nm). Fluo-3 and derivatives (Fluo-4, Fluo-5 etc) have also been widely used with two-photon excitation microscopy. Fluo-3 is an essentially nonfluorescent compound, but upon binding of Ca^{2+} its fluorescence increases sharply with an emission maximum at 525 nm suitable for conventionally used detectors designed for fluorescein isothiocyanate (FITC) measurements. This large change in fluorescence coupled with a good yield of photons provides very high contrast which allowed the detection of microscopic Ca^{2+} release events inside cells called "Calcium sparks". Whereas the salts of fluo-3 are unable to penetrate cells, loading can be achieved using its acetoxymethyl (AM) ester derivative. Once inside the cell, unspecific esterases cleave the ester effectively trapping fluo-3.

As calcium is a key second messenger within cells, the specific properties of fluo-3 enable researchers to investigate the time-resolved dynamics of intracellular signal transduction in a diverse range of cells.
