= Fura (food) =

Hausa fulani food

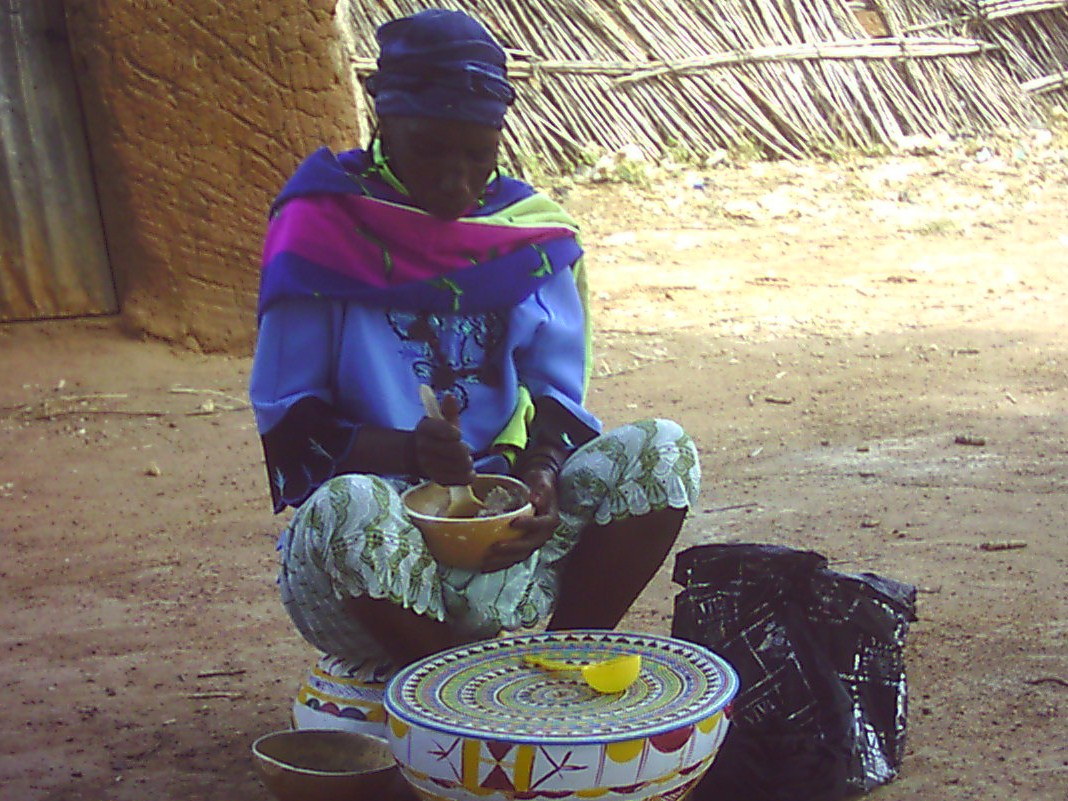
- A Fulani woman preparing fura da nono
- Place of origin: Sahel
- Region or state: West Africa
- Serving temperature: Cold
- Main ingredients: Millet

Fura or doonu or dawo is a type of food originating from West Africa's Sahel region and that is popular among the Zarma-Songhai, Fulani and Hausa peoples of the Sahel. It is a millet dough ball, with "fura" meaning millet ball. It is also eaten in Niger and Ghana. The millet is ground into a powdered form, rolled and molded into balls, then mashed and mixed with Nono - a fermented milk. The combination of fura and nono is known as Fura Da Nono, a locally made drink that contains carbohydrate and fiber. The fura food and the fura da nono drink are popular in Northern Nigeria. They are served on special occasions and as a meal in the afternoon.

== Preparation ==
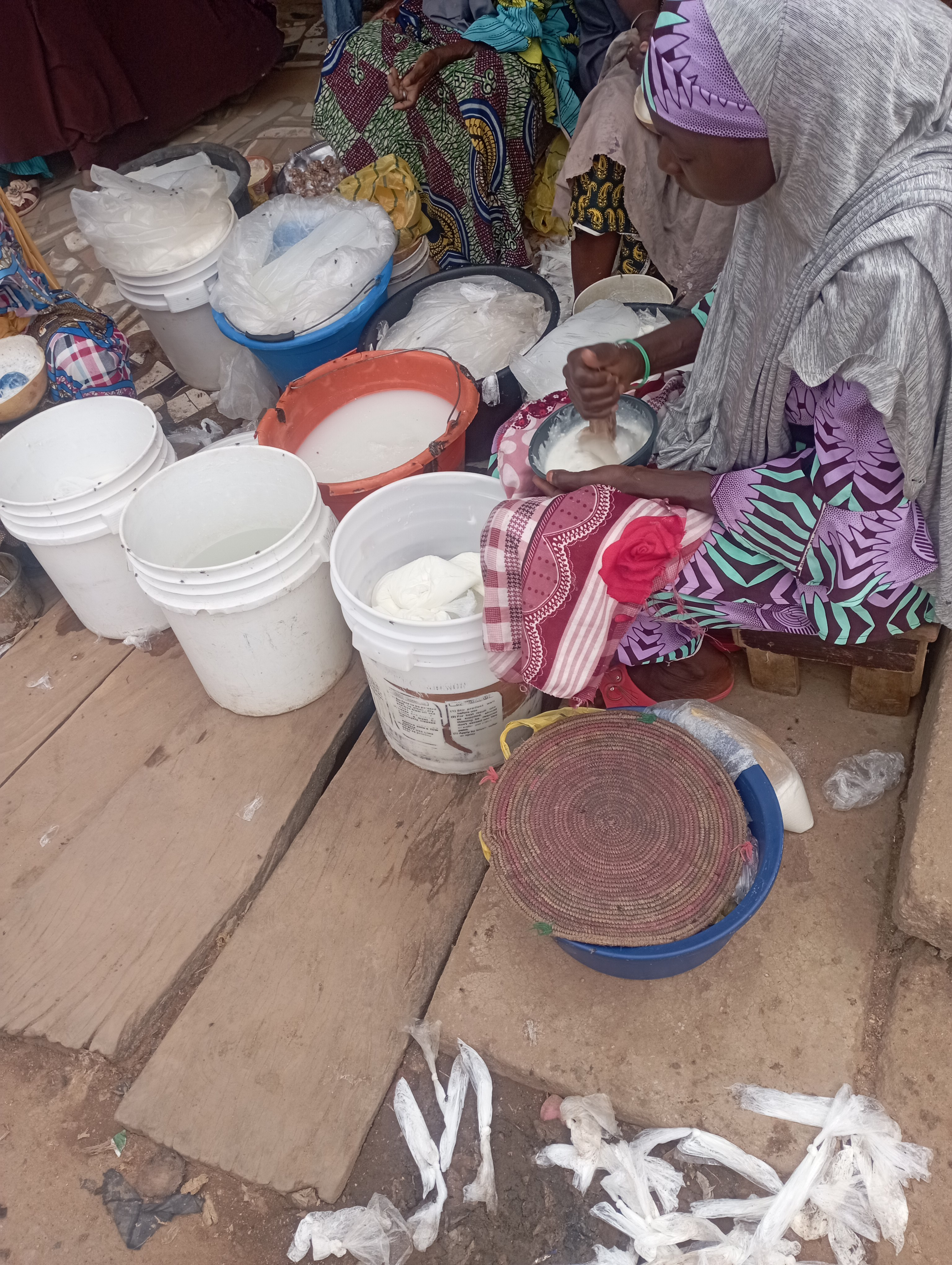
A Fulani woman preparing Fura

=== Ingredients ===
- Ground millet or Guinea corn
- Ground peppers
- Dried ground chili
- Dried ground ginger
- Ground cloves
- Salt to taste
- Sugar

=== Commercialization in Nigeria ===
Fura, popularly known in Nigeria as Fura da Nono, which was once seen as a local meal, has gradually evolved into a growing enterprise that involves modernized processing methods and production.
