= Land titling =

Assignment of land ownership to its occupants

Land titling is a form of land reform in which private individuals and families are given formal property rights for land which they have previously occupied informally or used on the basis of customary land tenure. Proponents argue that providing formal titles increases security of land tenure, supports development of markets in land, and allows better access to credit (using land titles as collateral). Peruvian economist Hernando de Soto Polar is the most well-known advocate of the approach, but it has a long history. Recently, "inspired by these ideas, and fostered by international development agencies, land titling programs have been launched throughout developing and transition economies as part of poverty alleviation efforts." The goals of poverty alleviation and urban management, however, can lead to conflicts in the design of land titling programs.

According to the World Bank, in "Why Secure Land Rights Matter" (2017):

Only 30% of the world’s population has a legally registered title to their land.

Research in China by Landesa and others has found that more than 40% of farmers lack written documentation to confirm their land rights, and that local governments can frequently take away or sell off their land rights. Where policy reforms have been implemented, the organizations report, farmers invest in and benefit from their land, and they estimate that secure land rights represent the equivalent of $1.2 trillion in farmers' hands. UN Habitat launched a "Global Campaign for Secure Tenure".

Evidence on the effectiveness of land titling for poverty reduction and economic development is mixed, with the key issue being the impact of titling on the security of land tenure, which varies. Particularly where customary land is involved, the introduction of formal land registration may have unpredictable effects, with the efficiency and marketisation of existing forms of land tenure underestimated, and the costs of formal registration underestimated and the security of formal land title overestimated. For example, in Sub-Saharan Africa, where land registration and titling are advocated by various groups as a pro-poor strategy, there are often multiple, conflicting claims to the same land by different individuals or groups. This means that formalizing land rights would benefit some groups more than others and create tensions. In many countries, recipients of formal title have later found that their titles did not give them the expected security in the face of market or state requirements to obtain their land. Some studies have found positive outcomes, albeit less strong than expected; one recent study on land titling in Argentina found that "entitling the poor increases their investment both in the houses and in the human capital of their children."

The way in which land titling is carried out may raise gender issues. While titling was expected to promote long term investments and ensure the transfer of land from less efficient to more efficient users, studies assessing the impact of tenure reform in Africa often found few significant effects of privatisation on production and, in some cases, even negative effects (Bruce and Migot Adholla 1994). The impacts of privatisation of pastoral rangelands on production have been particularly contentious (Rutten 1992, Peters 1994, Pinckney and Kimuyu 1994, Archambault 2007)

Joint titling successes happen, though most have not been complete successes, even when significant reforms have taken place. Despite Tanzanian legislation providing women the right to land and implementing default joint-titling, there has been little work on the ground to ensure this is implemented. In India, even with political support for joint-titling policy, institutional backing from local land authority's is needed to make progress. As each reform is important for establishing joint-titling regimes, they are worth considering independently, even if they ultimately failed
