= Fluo-4 =

- Skeletal formula of tetradeprotonated fluo-4

Names
- Preferred IUPAC name 2,2′-{[2-(2-{2-[Bis(carboxymethyl)amino]-5-(2,7-difluoro-6-hydroxy-3-oxo-3H-xanthen-9-yl)phenoxy}ethoxy)-4-methylphenyl]azanediyl}diacetic acid

Identifiers
CAS Number	273221-59-3
3D model (JSmol)	Interactive image
ChEBI	CHEBI:51103
ChemSpider	21865835
MeSH	Fluo-4
PubChem CID	25058176
UNII	8BZ6LK30PL
CompTox Dashboard (EPA)	DTXSID101029280
- InChI: InChI=1S/C36H30F2N2O13/c1-18-2-4-20(39(14-32(43)44)15-33(45)46)9-28(18)51-6-7-52-31-8-19(3-5-25(31)40(16-34(47)48)17-35(49)50)36-21-10-23(37)26(41)12-29(21)53-30-13-27(42)24(38)11-22(30)36/h2-5,8-13,41H,6-7,14-17H2,1H3,(H,43,44)(H,45,46)(H,47,48)(H,49,50) Key: WZZRKOQVHRRNDH-UHFFFAOYSA-N
- SMILES: CC1=CC(OCCOC2=CC(=CC=C2N(CC(O)=O)CC(O)=O)C2=C3C=C(F)C(=O)C=C3OC3=C2C=C(F)C(O)=C3)=C(C=C1)N(CC(O)=O)CC(O)=O

Properties
Chemical formula	C_{36}H_{30}F_{2}N_{2}O_{13}
Molar mass	736.634 g·mol^{−1}
- Except where otherwise noted, data are given for materials in their standard state (at 25 °C [77 °F], 100 kPa). Infobox references

Fluo-4 is used to measure calcium (Ca^{2+}) concentrations inside living cells, and is often used for high-throughput screening of receptor ligands and calcium permeable ion channels.

The green-fluorescent calcium indicator, Fluo-4, is an improved version of the calcium indicator, Fluo-3. It is commonly used as the non-fluorescent acetoxymethyl ester (Fluo-4 AM) which is cleaved inside the cell to give the free, fluorescent Fluo-4. It loads faster, is brighter at equivalent concentrations and is well-excited by the 488 nm line of the argon-ion laser which is often used in biological research laboratories. Fluo-4 and its cell-permeable AM ester are available from a few commercial vendors.
