= Cameleon (protein) =

Engineered protein used to visualize calcium levels in living cells

Cameleon is an engineered protein based on variant of green fluorescent protein used to visualize calcium levels in living cells. It is a genetically encoded calcium sensor created by Roger Y. Tsien and coworkers. The name is a combination of CaM (the common abbreviation of calmodulin) and chameleon to indicate that the sensor protein undergoes a conformation change and radiates at an altered wavelength upon calcium binding to the calmodulin element of the cameleon protein. Cameleon was the first genetically encoded calcium sensor that could be used for ratiometric measurements and the first to be used in a transgenic animal to record activity in neurons and muscle cells. Cameleon and other genetically encoded calcium indicators (GECIs) have found many applications in neuroscience and other fields of biology, including understanding the mechanisms of cell signaling by conducting time-resolved Ca^{2+} activity measurement experiments with endoplasmic reticulum (ER) enzymes. It was created by fusing BFP, calmodulin, calmodulin-binding peptide M13 and EGFP.

== Mechanism ==
The DNA encoding cameleon fusion protein must be either stably or transiently introduced into the cell of interest. Protein made by the cell according to this DNA information then serves as a fluorescent indicator of calcium concentration. In the presence of calcium, Ca^{2+} binds to M13, which enables calmodulin to wrap around the M13 domain. This brings the two GFP-variant proteins closer to each other, which increases FRET efficiency between them. A time-resolved spectroscopy study done on resonance energy transfer by Habuchi et al. in 2002 suggested the existence of 3 different calmodulin conformations that were dependent on Ca^{2+} binding. The study concluded that the mechanism of conformation interconversion remains unclear, but the data provided estimates of rate constants, energy transfer efficiency, and donor-acceptor distances in Ca^{2+}-free and Ca^{2+}-bound YC3.1 cameleon proteins.
