= Land reforms by country =

Land reform has been a recurring theme of enormous consequence in world history. They are often highly political and have been achieved (or attempted) in many countries.

== Latin America ==
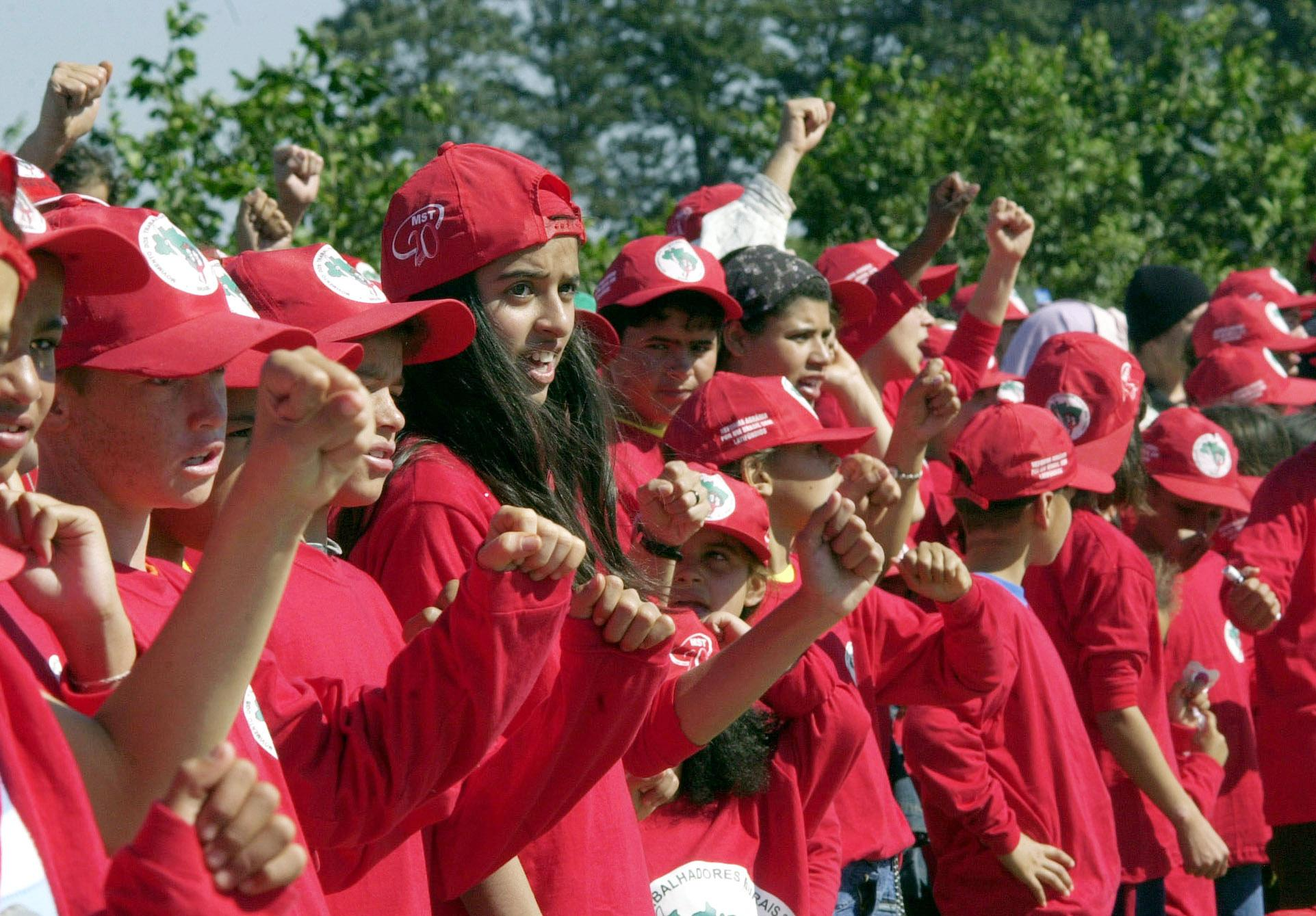
Children singing the "Internationale" at the 20th Anniversary of Brazil's Landless Workers' Movement

As a region, Latin America has historically been characterized by land inequality. Attempts at reforms were made in numerous countries in the aftermath of independence, as well as in the second half of the 20th century. Attempts to initiate land reforms have often sparked resistance by political and economic elites, which have resulted in coups and political instability.

=== Argentina ===
During and after the colonial period, Argentina has had political conflict between various groups and interests over land policy.

In 1836, the Argentine government sold 1,500 square leagues of public land to pay off government debts. President Nicolás Avellaneda implemented a land reform in 1876. The Argentine Homestead Act of October 12, 1884, modeled on similar policy in the United States, provided grants for people to settle remote agricultural lands in Patagonia and the Chaco. Once certain conditions were met, these individuals would get permanent title to their lands.

In contrast to other Latin American countries, Argentina's agricultural system during the 20th century did not have a semi-feudal system.

=== Brazil ===
Getúlio Vargas, who rose to presidency in Brazil following the Revolution of 1930, promised a land reform but reneged on his promise.

A first attempt to make a nationwide reform was set up in the government of José Sarney (1985–1990) as a result of the strong popular movement that had contributed to the fall of the military government. According to the 1988 Constitution of Brazil, the government is required to "expropriate for the purpose of agrarian reform, rural property that is not performing its social function" (Article 184). However, the "social function" mentioned there is not well defined, and hence the so-called First Land Reform National Plan never was put into action.

=== Bolivia ===
Land in Bolivia was unequally distributed – 92% of the cultivable land was held by large estates – until the Bolivian national revolution in 1952. Then, the Revolutionary Nationalist Movement government abolished forced peasantry labor and established a program of expropriation and distribution of the rural property of the traditional landlords to the indigenous peasants. A unique feature of the reform in Bolivia was the organization of peasants into syndicates. Peasants were not only granted land but their militias also were given large supplies of arms. The peasants remained a powerful political force in Bolivia during all subsequent governments. By 1970, 45% of peasant families had received title to land. Land reform projects continued in the 1970s and 1980s. A 1996 agrarian reform law increased protection for smallholdings and indigenous territories, but also protected absentee landholders who pay taxes from expropriation. Reforms were continued at 2006, with the Bolivian senate passing a bill authorizing the government redistribution of land among the nation's mostly indigenous poor.

=== Chile ===
Attempts at land reform began under the government of Jorge Alessandri in 1960, were accelerated during the government of Eduardo Frei Montalva (1964–1970), and reached its climax during the 1970-1973 presidency of Salvador Allende. Farms of more than 198 acres (80 ha) were expropriated. After the 1973 coup the process was halted by the military junta and substantially reversed.

=== Colombia ===
Starting from 1821, Columbia implemented a large-scale land reform, the oldest program of this kind in Latin America Since the beginning of the 20th century, the country transferred 23 million hectares of land, mostly benefitting poor peasants and people without land.

Alfonso López Pumarejo (1934–1938) passed Law 200 of 1936, which allowed for the expropriation of private properties, in order to promote "social interest".

Later attempts declined, until the National Front presidencies of Alberto Lleras Camargo (1958–1962) and Carlos Lleras Restrepo (1966–1970), which respectively created the Colombian Institute for Agrarian Reform (INCORA) and further developed land entitlement. In 1968 and 1969 alone, the INCORA issued more than 60,000 land titles to farmers and workers.

Despite this, the process was then halted and the situation began to reverse itself, as the subsequent violent actions of drug lords, paramilitaries, guerrillas and opportunistic large landowners severely contributed to a renewed concentration of land and to the displacement of small landowners. Between 1960 and 2010, land reforms were affected by equity issues and elite capture of land. In areas with typically small and medium size farms, the land distribution reduced inequalities in ownership. However, in areas where members of a rural elite already owned much of the land, the new plots were also diverted into the large farms.

=== Cuba ===
Land reform was among the chief planks of the revolutionary platform of 1959. The decree of May 1959 held that no corporation could own land, no private landowner could own more than 990 acres (with exceptions), and that each agricultural alborer would receive 66 acres for free. Almost all large holdings were seized by the National Institute for Agrarian Reform (INRA), which dealt with all areas of agricultural policy. A ceiling of 166 acres (67 hectares) was established, and tenants were given ownership rights, though these rights are constrained by government production quotas and a prohibition of real estate transactions. However, by 1962, 80 percent of all land was held by the government while the rest was held by small proprietors. In July 1962, Castro announced there would be an end to cooperatives and that those farms would all become "state farms."

=== El Salvador ===
Historically, El Salvador had inequitable distribution of land, with most of it concentrated among the so-called Fourteen Families. Whereas other states in Latin America had implemented land reforms, El Salvador still had a highly inequitable land system by the middle of the 20th century. By 1980, 38% of El Salvadorans were landless. Grievances related to land inequality have been characterized as a contributing factor to the Salvadoran Civil War.

=== Guatemala ===
Land reform occurred during the "Ten Years of Spring" (1944–1954) under the governments of Juan José Arévalo and Jacobo Árbenz, after a popular revolution forced out dictator Jorge Ubico. The largest part of the reform was the law officially called Decree 900, which redistributed all uncultivated land from landholdings that were larger than 673 acres (272 ha). If the estates were between 672 acres (272 ha) and 224 acres (91 ha) in size, uncultivated land was expropriated only if less than two-thirds of it was in use. The law benefited 500,000 people, or one-sixth of the Guatemalan Population. Historians have called this reform as one of the most successful land reforms in history. However, the United Fruit Company felt threatened by the law and lobbied the United States government, which was a factor in the US-backed coup that deposed Árbenz in 1954. The majority of the reform was rolled back by the US-supported military dictatorship that followed.

=== Haiti ===
Following Haiti's independence from France, land was distributed widely among the population. Most of the land ended in the hands of mullato Haitians.

During the presidency of Lysius Salomon (1879–1888), state land was distributed to farmers for the purposes of growing food intended for exports. The reform also enabled foreign companies to own land in Haiti (a practice that had been forbidden since independence).

=== Mexico ===
In 1856, the first land reform was driven by the ley Lerdo (the Lerdo law), enacted by the Liberal Party government of the Second Federal Republic of Mexico. One of the aims of the reform government was to develop the economy by returning to productive cultivation the underutilized lands of the Roman Catholic Church and the municipal communities (Indian commons), which required the division of these lands for sale, with the expectation that Mexico would develop a class of small owners. This was to be accomplished through the provisions of Ley Lerdo that prohibited ownership of land by the Church and the municipalities. The reform government also financed its war effort by seizing and selling church property and other large estates. Little land was acquired by individual small holders. After the war, the role of the state in land policy expanded during the presidency of Porfirio Diaz. The aim was to extinguish traditional subsistence farming and make agriculture in Mexico a dynamic commercial sector as part of Mexico's modernization. Land was concentrated in the hands of large-scale owners, a great many of them foreigners, leaving peasantry, the largest sector of the Mexican population, landless. Peasant unrest was a major cause of the Mexican Revolution of 1910–20. A certain degree of land reform was introduced, albeit unevenly, as part of the Mexican Revolution. The land reforms reduced inequality.

In 1934, president Lázaro Cárdenas passed the 1934 Agrarian Code and accelerated the pace of land reform. He helped redistribute 45,000,000 acres (180,000 km^{2}) of land, 4,000,000 acres (16,000 km^{2}) of which were expropriated from American owned agricultural property. This caused conflict between Mexico and the United States. Agrarian reform had come close to extinction in the early 1930s. The first few years of the Cárdenas's reform were marked by high food prices, falling wages, high inflation, and low agricultural yields. In 1935 land reform began sweeping across the country in the periphery and core of commercial agriculture. The Cárdenas alliance with peasant groups was awarded by the destruction of the hacienda system. Cárdenas distributed more land than all his revolutionary predecessors put together, a 400% increase. The land reform justified itself in terms of productivity; average agricultural production during the three-year period from 1939 to 1941 was higher than it had been at any time since the beginning of the revolution.

Starting with the government of Miguel Alemán (1946–52), land reform steps made in previous governments were rolled back. Alemán's government allowed capitalist entrepreneurs to rent peasant land. This created phenomenon known as neolatifundismo, where land owners build up large-scale private farms on the basis of controlling land which remains ejidal but is not sown by the peasants to whom it is assigned.

In 1970, President Luis Echeverría began his term by declaring land reform dead. In the face of peasant revolt, he was forced to backtrack, and embarked on the biggest land reform program since Cárdenas. Echeverría legalized take-overs of huge foreign-owned private farms, which were turned into new collective ejidos.

In 1988, President Carlos Salinas de Gortari was elected. In December 1991, he amended Article 27 of the Constitution, making it legal to sell ejido land and allow peasants to put up their land as collateral for a loan.

Francisco Madero and Emiliano Zapata were strongly identified with land reform, as are the present-day (as of 2006) Zapatista Army of National Liberation.

Today, most Mexican peasants are landowners. However, their holdings are usually too small, and farmers must supplement their incomes by working for the remaining landlords, and/or traveling to the United States.

See also: México Indígena (2005-2008 project)

=== Nicaragua ===
During and after the Nicaraguan Revolution (1979), the Sandinista government officially announced their political platform which included land reform.

The last months of Sandinista rule were criticized for the Piñata Plan, which distributed large tracts of land to prominent Sandinistas. After their loss in the 1990 elections, most of the Sandinista leaders held most of the private property and businesses that had been confiscated and nationalized by the FSLN government. This process became known as the piñata and was tolerated by the new government of Violeta Chamorro.

=== Peru ===
Land reform in the 1950s largely eliminated a centuries-old system of debt peonage. In 1965, a guerilla movement in the Southern highlands, which sought land reform, was defeated by counterinsurgency forces.

Further land reform occurred after the 1968 coup by left-wing General Juan Velasco Alvarado. The military regime under General Velasco (1968–75) launched a large-scale agrarian reform movement that attempted to redistribute land, hoping to break Peru's traditionally inequitable pattern of land holding and the hold of traditional oligarchy. The model used by Velasco to bring about change was the associative enterprise, in which former salaried rural workers and independent peasant families would become members of different kinds of cooperatives. About 22 million acres were redistributed, more land than in any reform program outside of Cuba. Unfortunately, productivity suffered as peasants with no management experience took control. The military government continued to spend huge amounts of money to transform Peru's agriculture to socialized ownership and management. These state expenditures are to blame for the enormous increase in Peru's external debt at the beginning of the 1970s. State bankruptcy was partly caused by the cheap credit the government extended to promote agrarian development, state subsidies, and administrative expenditures to carry out the agrarian reform during this period. The more radical effects of this reform were reversed by president Fernando Belaúnde Terry in the 1980s.

A third land reform occurred as part of a counterterrorism effort against the Shining Path during the Internal conflict in Peru roughly 1988–1995, led by Hernando de Soto and the Institute for Liberty and Democracy during the early years of the government of Alberto Fujimori, before the latter's auto-coup.

=== Venezuela ===
The system of land tenure from Colonial Venezuela was maintained into Venezuelan independence with the creation of the Republic of Venezuela in 1811. Throughout the 19th century and early 20th century, land was increasingly concentrated in the hands of a smaller set of landowners.

A land reform was implemented in 1918 that allowed individuals to claim unclaimed land. During the brief first period of democracy (El Trienio Adeco, 1945–48), the Democratic Action government redistributed land which it said had been gained illicitly by members of previous governments, and in mid-1948 it enacted an agrarian reform law. However, these reforms were reversed and most of the land redistributed was returned to its previous owners during the 1948-58 dictatorship of Marcos Pérez Jiménez, which overthrew the reformist government in a 1948 coup. After the 1958 restoration of democracy, a new land reform law was enacted in March 1960, with reform in the early 1960s concentrated in the northeastern states of Miranda, Aragua and Carabobo, and coming largely from expropriated private landholdings. The reform was accompanied by a considerable increase in agricultural production. Ultimately the reform saw about 200,000 families receive transfers of land, largely in the early 1960s.

In 2001, Hugo Chávez's government enacted Plan Zamora to redistribute government and unused private land to campesinos in need. The plan met with heavy opposition which led to a coup attempt in 2002. When Pedro Carmona took over the presidency during that event, he reversed the land reform. However, the reversal was declared null when the coup failed and Chávez returned to power. By the end of 2003, 60,000 families had received temporary title to a total of 55,000 km² of land under this plan. Despite the land reforms carried out by the government, which, according to some sources, have reduced the so-called latifundios (which means "big landownership"), most receivers of the land didn't have any knowledge about how to cultivate the land and grow crops. In many cases, peasants didn't even water, since water infrastructures were still missing in most of the regions. The land reform made Venezuela more dependent on foreign food imports.

Moreover, in some cases, campesinos didn't gain direct ownership of the land, but only the right to farm it without having to pay the rent and without sanctions from the government, and in some cases the land wasn't given to single peasant family, but managed in communes. According to some sources, the expropriated land amounts to 4-5 million hectares.

=== Paraguay ===
Paraguay's history is characterized by dictatorship and corruption. Colonial Paraguay had the encomienda system of forced labor and land distribution. Paraguay's history has brought along unequal land distributions. From the War of the Triple Alliance (1864–1870) Paraguay came out losing land to Argentina, Brazil, and Uruguay as well as suffered from a great decline in population and was left with political instability. Land in Paraguay has been known to be unequally distributed therefore prolonging rural poverty in Paraguay.

Nearly all land was owned by the Paraguay state following the War of the Triple Alliance. With the land sale laws of 1883 and 1885, the land was sold. Much of the land was sold to political elites who were able to secure loans from the state bank to acquire the land. Restrictions were placed on the ability of peasants to acquire land. The land sales led to the creation of landed estates and concentration of wealth.

The first major land reform was introduced following the February Revolution in 1936. The Agrarian Reform Law of May 1936 expropriated up to 5 million acres, and created more small- and medium-sized farms. Squatters were prioritized to receive land. After Rafael Franco was ousted from power in 1937, the pace of land redistribution slowed.

Under the dictatorship of President Alfredo Stroessner in the years of 1954 to 1989, the regime took away many campesino's land in order to give it to military officials, foreign corporations and civilian supporters, "over eight million hectares of state-owned land (20 percent of total land) were given away or sold at negligible prices to friends of the regime, who accumulated huge tracts of land." Stroessner also faked an alliance with the Colorado Party in order to distribute public land. Campesinos' cries for help for land reform were ignored and the prosecution against them continued, causing them to suffer from high poverty rates. June S. Beittel said that as a result of the unequal distribution of land it left, " rural areas the most poverty-stricken." In the year of 1954, the Truth and Justice Committee focused on getting justice for the abuses many Campesinos were facing from their own government.

After decades of controversy over government land policy, two agrarian laws were created in 1963. These laws were known as the Agrarian Statute, "limiting the maximum size of landholding to 10,000 hectares in Eastern Paraguay and 20,000 hectares in the Chaco." However, these laws were rarely enforced. Under the Agrarian Statute, there was also the creation of IBR (Instituto de Bienestar Rural) which "mandated to plan colonization programs, issue land titles to farmers, and provide new colonies with support services." Although IBR focused on serving the land needs of farmers their task was so big and its resources so little that their goals for helping farmers were out of reach.

Paraguayan democracy came a long way after its 35-year dictatorship, but the unequal distribution of land is still a problem for the nation since their economy is one that is dependent on its agriculture. A census in 2008 revealed that "80 percent of agriculture land is held by just 1.6 percent of landowners, with the 600 largest properties occupying 40 percent of the total productive land. More than 300,000 family farmers have no land at all." Paraguayans have formed unions such as National Federation of Campesinos (FNC) who has fought for justice on the unequal land distributions in Latin America they have helped many campesinos reclaim acres of land since 1989. The ongoing inequality of land distribution has led to a demand for land regulation. Citizens remain cautious about the nation's democracy and fearful of the return of dictatorship and corruption.

The problem regarding land distribution has worsened recently due to the expansion of monoculture in specific, soy. Paraguay has become the fourth world's largest distributors of soy. Due to this distribution, soy companies are the largest landowners, taking over 80 percent of the land. This production has negatively impacted the lives of rural peasants by leaving them without their own land. Thus, in March 2017, the streets of Paraguay's capital were filled with more than 1000 campesinos demanding for agrarian reform.

Thousands of rural peasants demand access to land, fair agricultural prices for what they produce and technical assistance. Due to the increase in soy production, campesinos has been forced out of their lands leading them to demand land regulations. This demand of the stabilization and fairness of agricultural prices is a result of Paraguay's government failing to sustain secure prices for their produce which are leaving them to live in extreme poverty. In the effect of no secure economy for their produce, campesinos mandate technical help.

A great majority of Paraguayans continue to practice subsistence agriculture in the depths of the Paraguayan campo (countryside). Despite their struggle with poverty, inequality and land rights, Paraguayans are proud of their campesino structure and the traditional culture that arises from it, with this culture being the most prominent in Paraguay than anywhere else in Latin America.

In December 2017, "over one-third of the population was impoverished and 19% were living in 'extreme poverty'", so "the further centralization of land and power has only functioned to exacerbate socio-economic issues." Thus, the campesino movement is still ongoing due to the desire to continue their campesino traditions and to be able to make a living wage doing so.

== Middle East and North Africa ==
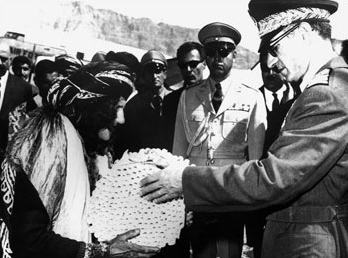
The shah distributing land deeds during Iran's White Revolution

=== Ottoman Empire ===
The Ottoman Land Code of 1858 (1274 in the Islamic calendar) was the beginning of a systematic land reform programme started during the Tanzimat period by Sultan Abdülmecid I of the Ottoman Empire during the latter half of the 19th century, with the overall aims of increasing state revenue generated from land and for the state to be able to have greater control over individual plots of land. This was followed by the 1873 land emancipation act.

=== Egypt ===
Initially, Egyptian land reform essentially abolished the political influence of major land owners. However, land reform only resulted in the redistribution of about 15% of Egypt's land under cultivation, and by the early 1980s, the effects of land reform in Egypt drew to a halt as the population of Egypt moved away from agriculture. The Egyptian land reform laws were greatly curtailed under Anwar Sadat and eventually abolished.

=== Iran ===
Significant land reform in Iran took place under the shah as part of the socio-economic reforms of the White Revolution, begun in 1962, and agreed upon through a public referendum. At this time the Iranian economy was not performing well and there was political unrest. Essentially, the land reforms amounted to a huge redistribution of land to rural peasants who previously had no possibility of owning land as they were poorly paid labourers. The land reforms continued from 1962 until 1971 with three distinct phases of land distribution: private, government-owned and endowed land. These reforms resulted in the newly created peasant landowners owning six to seven million hectares, around 52-63% of Iran's agricultural land. According to Country-Data, even though there had been a considerable redistribution of land, the amount received by individual peasants was not enough to meet most families' basic needs, "About 75 percent of the peasant owners [however] had less than 7 hectares, an amount generally insufficient for anything but subsistence agriculture.". By 1979 a quarter of prime land was in disputed ownership and half of the productive land was in the hands of 200,000 absentee landlords The large land owners were able to retain the best land with the best access to fresh water and irrigation facilities. In contrast, not only were the new peasant land holdings too small to produce an income but the peasants also lacked both quality irrigation system and sustained government support to enable them to develop their land to make a reasonable living. Set against the economic boom from oil revenue it became apparent that the Land Reforms did not make life better for the rural population: according to Amid, "..only a small group of rural people experienced increasing improvements in their welfare and poverty remained the lot of the majority". Moghadam argues that the structural changes to Iran, including the land reforms, initiated by the White Revolution, contributed to the revolution in 1979 which overthrew the Shah and turned Iran into an Islamic republic.

=== Iraq ===
Under British Mandate, Iraq's land was moved from communal land owned by the tribe to tribal sheikhs that agreed to work with the British Empire. Known as compradors, these families controlled much of Iraq's arable land until the end of British rule in 1958. Throughout the 1920s and 30s, more and more land began to be centered in the hands of just a couple families. By 1958 eight individual families owned almost 1 million acres (400 thousand hectares). However, the British did attempt to instill some reforms to increase the productivity of the land in Iraq. In 1926 the Pump Law was introduced, essentially legislating that all newly irrigated land would be tax free for 4 years. This led to some short term gains in land productivity. If land was cultivated for 15 years, it then became the property of the person who cultivated that land. From 1914 to 1943 there was an increase from 1 million to 4.25 million acres of land developed. Unfortunately, irrigation of the land was irresponsible, and many farmers didn't allow for drainage, which led to a buildup of salt and minerals in the land, killing its productivity.

In 1958 the rise of the Iraqi Communist Party led to the seizing of much of the land by the Iraqi Republic. Landholdings were capped at 600 acres (240 hectares) in arable areas and 1,200 acres (490 hectares) in areas that had rainfall. The concentrated landholdings by the state were then redistributed among the populace, in amounts of 20 acres (8.1 hectares) in irrigated land, with 40 acres (16 hectares) in land with rainfall.

In 1970, the Ba'ath Party, led by Saddam Hussein began instituting a wide series of sweeping land reforms. The intent of the reforms was to remove control of land owned by the traditional rural elites and redistribute it to peasant families. Modeled after the 1958 land reforms, much of the state land was rented out, though often to people who originally owned the large swathes of land. The key to this new reform was the Agrarian Reform Law of 1970.Between 1970 and 1982, 264,400 farmers received grants of land. However, these reforms did not contribute to an improvement in the production of agricultural goods, leading the regime to increase its imports of food products.

=== Maghreb ===
As elsewhere in North Africa, lands formerly held by European farmers have been taken over. The nationalisation of agricultural land in Algeria, Morocco and Tunisia led to the departure of the majority of Europeans.

=== Syria ===
Land reforms were first implemented in Syria during 1958. The Agricultural Relations Law laid down a redistribution of rights in landownership, tenancy and management.

The reforms were halted in 1961 due to a culmination of factors, including opposition from large landowners and severe crop failure during a drought between 1958 and 1961, whilst Syria was a member of the doomed United Arab Republic (UAR).

After the Ba'ath Party gained power in 1963 the reforms were resumed. The reforms were portrayed by the governing Ba'ath as politically motivated to benefit the rural property-less communities. According to Zaki al-Arsuzi, a co-founder of the Ba'ath Party, the reforms would "liberate 75 percent of the Syrian population and prepare them to be citizens qualified to participate in the building of the state".

It has been argued that the land reform represented work by the 'socialist government', however, by 1984 the private sector controlled 74 percent of Syria's arable land. This questions both Ba'ath claims of commitment to the redistribution of land to the majority of peasants as well as the state government being socialist (if it allowed the majority of land to be owned in the private sector how could it truly be socialist?). Hinnebusch argued that the reforms were a way of galvanising support from the large rural population: "they [Ba'ath Party members] used the implementation of agrarian reform to win over and organise peasants and curb traditional power in the countryside". To this extent the reforms succeeded and resulted with an increase in Ba'ath party membership. They also prevented political threat emerging from rural areas by bringing the rural population into the system as supporters.

== South Asia ==
=== Afghanistan ===
Afghanistan has had a couple of attempts at land reform.

In 1975, the Republic of Afghanistan under President Mohammad Daoud Khan responded to the inequities of the existing land tenure conditions by issuing a Land Reform Law. It limited individual holdings to a maximum of 20 hectares of irrigated, double-cropped land. Larger holdings were allowed for less productive land. The government was to expropriate all surplus land and pay compensation. To prevent the proliferation of small, uneconomic holdings, priority for redistributed lands was to be given to neighboring farmers with two hectares or less. Landless sharecroppers, laborers, tenants, and nomads had next priority. Despite the government's rhetorical commitment to land reform, the program was quickly postponed. Because the government's landholding limits applied to families, not individuals, wealthy families avoided expropriation by dividing their lands nominally between family members. The high ceilings for landholdings restricted the amount of land actually subject to redistribution. Finally, the government lacked the technical data and organizational bodies to pursue the program after it was announced.

After the 1978 Saur Revolution, the communist Peoples Democratic Party of Afghanistan (PDPA) issued Decree No. 6, which canceled gerau and other mortgage debts of agricultural laborers, tenants, and small landowners with less than two hectares of land. The cancellation applied only to debts contracted before 1973. The Decree No. 8 of November 1978 made new landholdings from the 20 hectares of prime irrigated land in the 1975 law to just six hectares. It divided all land into seven classes and again allowed for larger holdings of less productive land. There was no compensation for government-expropriated surplus land and it established categories of farmers who had priority for redistributed land; sharecroppers already working on the land had highest priority.

During the second and third Afghan Civil Wars, the Taliban promised land reform to Pashtun peasants as a recruiting method, and, in many cases, followed up on this promise. The Taliban began a campaign of massacring landlords (many of whom were pro-Northern Alliance) and giving their lands to Pashtun peasants who fought for the Taliban.

=== India ===
Under the British occupation, the land system in India has been feudalist, with few absentee landlords holding most of the lands and claiming high rents from poor peasants. The demand for a land reform was a major theme in the demand for independence. After independence, the different states in India gradually started a land reform process in four main categories: abolition of intermediaries (rent collectors under the pre-Independence land revenue system); tenancy regulation (to improve the contractual terms including security of tenure); a ceiling on landholdings (to redistribute surplus land to the landless); and attempts to consolidate disparate landholdings. The extent and success of these reforms varied greatly between the different states of India.

=== Pakistan ===
Under the rule of Zulfikar Ali Bhutto a land reform program was introduced. The significant land reforms included the reduction of land ceilings and the introduction of tenancy security for tenant farmers. The land ceiling was fixed at 150 acres (0.61 km^{2}) of irrigated land and 300 acres (1.2 km^{2}) of non-irrigated land.

=== Sri Lanka ===
In 1972, the Government of Sirimavo Bandaranaike, through the Land Reform Act of No. 01 of 1972, imposed a ceiling of twenty hectares on privately owned land and sought to distribute lands in excess of the ceiling for the benefit of landless peasants. Private lands that were in excess were vested in under the Land Reform Commission with its former owners paid a compensation which came to a nominal value based on government valuations that were below market rates. Both land owned by public companies and paddy lands under ten hectares in extent were exempted from this ceiling. Between 1972 and 1974, the Land Reform Commission took over nearly 228,000 hectares. In 1975 the Land Reform (Amendment) Law brought over 169,000 hectares of plantations owned by companies (including British-owned companies) under state control. Following the second wave of land reclamations, the government gained control of vast amounts of plantation estates that produced the main exports of the country, mainly the tea industry. Most of the estates vested to the state were allocated to the Sri Lanka State Plantations Corporation, the Janatha Estate Development Board (People's Estate Development Board) and the USAWASAMA (Upcountry Cooperative Estate Development Board). In the years following these land reforms, the production of the key export crops which Sri Lanka depended on for the in follow of foreign currency dropped. The productivity and production of these estates declined due to mismanagement and lack of investments, becoming a burden on the General Treasury, which itself had heavily taxed its profits reducing investments and welfare of the workers. In the 1980's and 1990's these estates had been privatized. In 2021, the Committee on Public Enterprises (COPE) of the Parliament of Sri Lanka revealed that the Land Reform Commission owned close to 1.7 million acres of land (approx. 10% of the land mass of Sri Lanka) and its value has not been correctly estimated.

== Europe ==
=== Albania ===
Albania has gone through three waves of land reform since the end of World War II: in 1946, the land in estates and large farms was expropriated by the communist People's Republic of Albania and redistributed among small peasants; in the 1950s, the land was reorganized into large-scale collective farms; and after 1991, the land was again redistributed among private smallholders.

=== Denmark ===
In the 18th and 19th century, the Danish government implemented several land reforms. In the second half of the 18th century, the focus of reforms were to transfer land from major landholders to occupiers of the land. In the 19th century, reforms sought to make farmers part of larger estates.

=== Czechoslovakia ===
In 1918, all land owned by Habsburgs was confiscated. In 1919, the Land Reform Act forced large landholders - mostly nobility and church - to sell their land to the state which in turn sold it to the peasants. This concerned arable land only – forests, vineyards, and pastures were excluded. During the Holocaust in Slovakia, the Land Reform Act of February 1940 confiscated and nationalized 101,423 hectares (250,620 acres) of land owned by 4,943 Jews.

=== Estonia ===
Estonia has witnessed two periods of land reform in 1919 and 1991 which occurred very shortly after the declaration of Estonian independence and the restoration of independence respectively. The act of 1919 was primarily concerned with the transferral of land ownership from Baltic Germans to ethnic Estonians. The 1991 act was instead aimed at the transfer of land ownership from the state (having been nationalised under Soviet occupation) to private individuals based on historic land ownership in 1940 as well as the protection of the legal rights of the present users of land.

=== Finland ===
In the general reparcelling out of land, begun in 1757 when Finland was a part of the Swedish Empire, the medieval model of all fields consisting of numerous strips, each belonging to a farm, was replaced by a model of fields and forest areas each belonging to a single farm. In the further reparcellings, which started in 1848 when Finland was part of the Russian Empire, the idea of concentrating all the land in a farm to a single piece of real estate was reinforced. In these reparcelling processes, the land is redistributed in direct proportion to earlier prescription. Both the general reparcelling and the further reparcelling processes are still active in some parts of the country, and a new reparcelling can be initiated when the local need for such reparcelling arises. After the Finnish Civil War, when Finland had become independent, a series of land reforms followed. These included the compensated transfer of lease-holdings (torppa) to the leasers and prohibition of forestry companies to acquire land. The reforms led to greater economic equality.

After the Second World War, Karelians evacuated from areas ceded to the Soviet Union were given land in remaining Finnish areas, taken from public and private holdings with less than full compensation to the previous owners. Also the war veterans, and their widows benefited from these allotments. In addition, land could be provided to farms considered too small. The land could be acquired either via a voluntary purchase by the state or via expropriation. As a result of post-WWII land reform, 30,000 new farms were established, 33,000 small farms received more land and 67,000 families received either a plot for a single-family home or a homestead with some arable land.

=== Germany ===
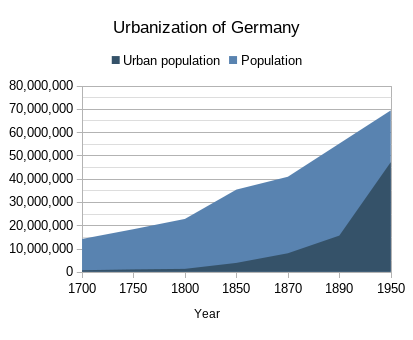
Population and urban population of Germany (1700 to 1950)

Land reform in Germany can be seen as three separate but connected movements that build on each other chronologically. Peasants were first liberated from serfdom in the Prussian reforms from 1763 until 1859. Following rapid urbanization in Europe, several influential socialist and communist economists such as Karl Marx, Friedrich Engels, Karl Kautsky and Eduard Bernstein began to discuss land reforms in the 1830s. Their theories inspired private settlements and official government programms for the so called Binnenkolonisierung (interior colonization), whereby wasteland could be transformed into homesteads for the poor. Finally, land was collectivized under the East German Bodenreform between 1956 and 1975 but West German agriculture remained largely unchanged.

=== Greece ===
In ancient Athens, major land reforms were carried out under the direction of Solon Pisistratus, which led to the creation of a strong class of small and middle peasants. Major land reforms was also undertaken in Sparta under various leaders such as Cleomenes III and Nabis of Sparta.

=== Ireland ===
At the 19th century, most of the land in Ireland belonged to large landowners, most of them of English origin. Most of the Irish population were tenants, having few rights and forced to pay high rents. This situation was a contributory factor to the Great Irish Famine of 1845-1852 and the main cause of the Land Wars of 1870s-1890s.

The governments of the United Kingdom of Great Britain and Ireland responded to the agitations in Ireland with a series of land acts, beginning with the Landlord and Tenant (Ireland) Act 1870 (initiated by prime minister William Ewart Gladstone), followed by further five land acts overseen by a Land Commission, prior to independence in 1922, by which time over 90% of lands had transferred from landlords to their former tenant farmers on negotiated terms with funding provided by the UK government.

=== Italy ===
Land reform has been a long-standing and widespread problem before the 20th century, especially in Southern Italy. Despite the vain attempts of the governments to redistribute the land in Southern Italy (the so-called Mezzogiorno), from the pragmatic decree De administratione Universitatum (1792) of Ferdinand I of the Two Sicilies to the law Leggi eversive delle feudalità (which literally means "laws abolishing feudalism") in 1806–1808, enacted by Joseph Bonaparte, the issue remained largely unsolved, mainly because of the strenuous opposition of the great landowners, unwilling to lose their privileges and to allow the emancipation of the peasant class. Even with the Unification of Italy, despite the promises of the abolition of the so-called latifondi ("large estates"), the problem remained unsolved. Southern Italy's big landowners, which had been loyal to the Bourbons until the 1860, actively contributed to the unification of Italy in order to not lose its prestige, and expropriating estates from them would have implied, for the Kingdom of Italy (1861–1946), to have a powerful enemy. Southern Italy's peasants, disappointed and irritated, rebelled and provoked a bloody civil war, known as Post-Unification Brigandage.

The first effective land reform was carried out in 1950, right after the birth of the Italian Republic. Italian Parliament passed the decree legge stralcio n. 841 del 21 ottobre 1950, which provided the legal basis for land expropriation and redistribution. The redistribution occurred over a longer period of time, about 10–20 years.

The decree, financed in part with the funds of Marshall Plan, launched by the United States in 1947, but also opposed by conservative members of the American administration probably was, according to some scholars, the most important reform of the aftermath of World War II. The 1950 land reform redistributed land from large landowners to landless farmers. The decree provided that the land had to be distributed to peasants through compulsory purchase, thus turning them into small entrepreneurs no longer subjected to large landowners. According to a 2026 study, the land reform harmed economic growth and slowed industrialization in affected municipalities. A 2022 study found that the land reform "fueled comparative underdevelopment and precarity locally over the long term. Several related mechanisms delayed development in land reform zones: a slower transition out of agriculture, lower labor mobility, and an aging demographic."

After the land reform of 1950, large estates (latifondi) in some regions of Italy by law cannot be bigger than 300 ha (740 acres). Before the 1950, large estates were widespread, especially in Southern Italy. Nowadays large estate aren't present anymore on Italy's territory. For example, in Sicily before the 1950, estates larger than 500 ha (1,200 acres) later averaged at about 230 ha (570 acres). Moreover, 20.6 percent of the island's land was owned by only 282 big landowners. In the region Abruzzo, large estates were also widespread. The most notable case is perhaps the estate of the Torlonia family, which owned large estates near Piana del Fucino; its size was more than 14,000 ha (35,000 acres), and it was redistributed to 5,000 Italian families of landless farmers.

=== Latvia ===
The Latvian Land Reform of 1920 was a land reform act expropriating land under the first Republic of Latvia in 1920 (during the Latvian War of Independence shortly after independence). The agrarian reform law of 1920 sought to transfer most of the land from Baltic German nobles to Latvian farmers. On September 16, 1920 Constitutional Assembly of Latvia passed the law of the Land reform, which would break up large landholdings and redistribute land to those peasants who worked it and to the newly created Latvian State Land Fund. The reform was officially considered completed in 1937.

After the restoration of Latvian independence, land rights that were in force before the Soviet occupation in 1940, were restored as a part of the denationalization process.

=== Luxembourg ===
Some feudal privileges were abolished in Luxembourg as part of a larger reform effort by Maria-Theresa of Austria (Luxembourg was under Austro-Hungarian rule) in 1766. Full abolition of feudalism in Luxembourg took place in 1795 when Luxembourg was made part of the French revolutionary regime.

=== Portugal ===
Portugal implemented a land reform in the mid-1970s.

=== Russia and the Soviet Union ===
The Emancipation reform of 1861, effected during the reign of Alexander II of Russia, abolished serfdom throughout the Russian Empire. More than 23 million people received their liberty. Serfs were granted the full rights of free citizens, gaining the rights to marry without having to gain consent, to own property and to own a business. The Manifesto prescribed that peasants would be able to buy the land from the landlords.

Until the beginning of the 20th century, the vast majority of Russian peasants held their land in communal ownership within peasant communities called mirs, which acted as village governments and cooperatives. Arable land was divided in sections based on soil quality and distance from the village. Each household had the right to claim one or more strips from each section depending on the number of adults in the household. This communal system was abolished in 1906 by the capitalist-oriented Stolypin reforms. The reforms introduced the unconditional right of individual landownership. They encouraged peasants to buy their share of the community lands, leave the communities and settle in privately owned settlements called Khutors. By 1910 the share of private settlements among all rural households in the European Russia was estimated at 10.5%.

The Stolypin reforms and the majority of their benefits were reversed after the October Revolution of 1917. The Decree on Land, issued by Vladimir Lenin's new Bolshevik government, and the "Fundamental Law of Land Socialization" of 1918, decreed that private ownership of land is totally abolished - land may not be sold, purchased, leased, mortgaged, or otherwise alienated. All land, whether state, crown, monastery, church, factory, entailed, private, public, peasant, etc., shall be confiscated without compensation and become the property of the whole people, and pass into the use of all those who cultivate it. These decrees were superseded by the 1922 Land Code of the Russian Soviet Federative Socialist Republic. After the universal agricultural collectivization, land codes of the Soviet republics lost their significance. See Agriculture in the Soviet Union.

After winning World War II and occupying much of Central and Eastern Europe, the Soviet Union implemented similar collectivization policies in its new satellite states in the Eastern Bloc.

After the dissolution of the Soviet Union, a new land code was enacted, allowing private land ownership.

=== Sweden ===
In 1757, the general reparcelling out of land began. In this process, the medieval principle of dividing all the fields in a village into strips, each belonging to a farm, was changed into a principle of each farm consisting of a few relatively large areas of land. The land was redistributed in proportion to earlier possession of land, while uninhabited forests far from villages were socialized.

In the 20th century, Sweden, almost non-violently, arrived at regulating the length minimum of tenant farming contracts at 25 years.

=== Ukraine ===
==== 1990s ====
Before the dissolution of the Soviet Union in December 1991, Ukrainian farmers worked on collective farms and a free market had only existed for around a year. In the aftermath of the dissolution, more than 6 million Ukrainians received plots of arable land, getting between two and three hectares each. In 2001, a ban was imposed on sales of farmland, in order to deter speculation. The law also prevented the farmers from using farmland as collateral for bank loans. The 2001 law has also prevented the government from selling millions of additional hectares. Only five other countries in the world, among them China and North Korea, had maintained similar restrictions on the sale of private agricultural land.

==== Reform ====
In Ukraine a debate around the land reform has lasted for more than 20 years and it is still not over.

— Olena Bogdan, 2011

The European Court for Human Rights ruled in the May 2018 judgement of Zelenchuk and Tsytsyura v. Ukraine that the ban violates the Ukrainian Constitution by preventing owners from fully exercising their property rights. The Groysman Government pledged in July 2017 to lift the ban on sales of farmland. According to a 2020 estimate of the World Bank a land-reform programme could bring an increase up to 1.5% in GDP. The party Batkivshchyna opposed, and pledged in 2018 to initiate a nationwide referendum to stop the lifting of the ban on sales of farmland.

In July 2019, President Volodymyr Zelenskyy has initiated the reforms of the land laws to pass to lift the ban. A brawl broke out in the Verkhovna Rada (Ukraine's parliament) on 6 February 2020 over the bill. The Verkhovna Rada terminated the Honcharuk Government on 5 March 2020 and pledged the passage of legislation sought by the International Monetary Fund to lift the ban on sales of agricultural land. The Honcharuk Government had appeared to be too weak to pass the necessary reforms through the Verkhovna Rada during several weeks of protest by agriculturalists, even in spite of Zelenskyy's personal appearances. By March 2020, the IMF remained concerned about the pace of land reforms. Ukraine in 2020 needed to repay $17 billion of foreign loans and the International Monetary Fund pressured the government to enact laws which would hasten land reform in exchange for a $5.5 billion loan-package.

On 31 March 2020, the Verkhovna Rada adopted a law introducing amendments on the sale of agricultural land. Per the law, the moratorium on the sale of agricultural land was lifted on 1 July 2021. From July 2021 until 1 January 2024, temporarily no more than 100 hectares were allowed to be owned per person and no companies were able to buy land.

==== After reform ====
As of 2023 the average price per hectare was 40000 hryvnias (apprixamately 1060 USD).

=== United Kingdom ===
Advocates of land reform in Britain have included the 17th-century Diggers, John Stuart Mill, Alfred Russel Wallace, and Jesse Collings. Currently the Labour Land Campaign promotes the case for a land value tax, one of the results of which would be some land reform. The Green Party of England and Wales and the Scottish Green Party support land value tax. Currently aristocrats still own a third of England and Wales.

==== Scotland ====
In the 21st century, land reform in Scotland has focused on the abolition and modernisation of Scotland's antiquated feudal land tenure system, security of tenure for crofters and decentralisation of Scotland's highly concentrated private land ownership. Scotland's land reform is distinct from other contemporary land reforms in its focus on community land ownership , with the Land Reform (Scotland) Acts of 2003 and 2016 establishing the Community Right to Buy, allowing rural and urban communities first right of refusal to purchase local land when it comes up for sale. Crofting communities are granted a similar Right to Buy though they do not require a willing seller to buy out local crofting land. Under the Community Empowerment (Scotland) Act 2015 and Land Reform (Scotland) Act 2016, Scottish ministers can grant a compulsory sale order for vacant or derelict private land or land which, if owned by the local community, could further sustainable development.

=== Yugoslavia ===
The first was the land reform in interwar Yugoslavia largely carried out in 1919–1931 and another following the World War II and the start of the communist rule in the country.

== Africa ==
=== Ethiopia ===
Historically, Ethiopia was divided into the northern highlands, which constituted the core of the old Christian kingdom, and the southern highlands, most of which were brought under imperial rule by conquest. In the northern regions, the major form of ownership was a type of communal system known as rist. According to this system, all descendants of an individual founder were entitled to a share, and individuals had the right to use a plot of family land. Rist was hereditary, inalienable, and inviolable. No user of any piece of land could sell his or her share outside the family or mortgage or bequeath his or her share as a gift, as the land belonged not to the individual but to the descent group. Most peasants in the northern highlands held at least some rist land. Absentee landlordism was rare, and landless tenants were estimated at only about 20% of holdings. On the contrary, in the southern provinces, few farmers owned the land on which they worked. After the conquest, officials divided southern land equally among the state, the church, and the indigenous population. Tenancy in the southern provinces ranged between 65% and 80% of the holdings, and tenant payments to landowners averaged as high as 50% of the produce. In the Eastern Lowland periphery and the Great Rift Valley, most land was used for grazing. The pastoral social structure is based on a kinship system with strong interclan connections; grazing and water rights are regulated by custom.

Beginning in the 1950s, the government tried to modernize agriculture by granting large tracts of traditional grazing lands to large corporations and converting them into large-scale commercial farms. In the north and south, peasant farmers lacked the means to improve production because of the fragmentation of holdings, a lack of credit, and the absence of modern facilities. Particularly in the south, the insecurity of tenure and high rents killed the peasants' incentive to improve production. Further, those attempts by the Imperial government to improve the peasant's title to their land were often met with suspicion. By the mid-1960s, many sectors of Ethiopian society favored land reform. University students led the land reform movement and campaigned against the government's reluctance to introduce land reform programs and the lack of commitment to integrated rural development.

In 1974, the socialist Derg government rose to power, and on March 4, 1975, the Derg announced its land reform program. The government nationalized rural land without compensation, abolished tenancy, forbade the hiring of wage labor on private farms, ordered all commercial farms to remain under state control, and granted each peasant family so-called "possessing rights" to a plot of land not to exceed ten hectares. The Ethiopian Orthodox Church lost all its land. This reform resulted in a rare show of popular support for the junta.

Tenant farmers in southern Ethiopia welcomed the land reform, but in the northern highlands, many people resisted land reform and perceived it as an attack on their rights to rist land. The lowland peripheries were only slightly affected by the reforms.

The land reform destroyed the feudal order. It changed landowning patterns – particularly in the south – in favor of peasants and small landowners. It also provided the opportunity for peasants to participate in local matters by permitting them to form associations.

=== Kenya ===
The colonial administration in Kenya implemented a land documentation system in the early 1900s. In the 1970s, politicians engaged in extensive sales and exploitation of fraudulent land documents. By the late 1990s, the land documentation system had fallen into disrepute due to extensive fraud.

Two land reforms occurred amid the Mau Mau uprising. The first, in the mid-1950s, allowed Africans to consolidate and gain individual legal titles to their land. The second enabled Africans to buy land from Europeans, many of whom sought to liquidate their holdings in Kenya prior to Kenyan independence.

In the 1960s, president Jomo Kenyatta launched a peaceful land reform program based on "willing buyer-willing seller". It was funded by the United Kingdom, the former colonial power.

In 2006, president Mwai Kibaki said it will repossess all land owned by "absentee landlords" in the coastal strip and redistribute it to squatters.

A 2023 study found that over the course of independent Kenyan history, democratic governments engaged in greater formalization of land rights than autocratic regimes and that democratic governments tended to formalize land rights to gain the support of pivotal swing voters.

=== Namibia ===
Namibia's colonial past had resulted in substantial land inequality where about 20% of the population (mostly white settlers) owned about 75 percent of all the land.

In 1990, shortly after Namibia achieved independence from South Africa, its first president Sam Nujoma initiated a plan for land reform, in which land would be redistributed from whites to blacks. Legislation passed in September 1994, with a compulsory, compensated approach. The land reform has been slow, mainly because Namibia's constitution only allows land to be bought from farmers willing to sell. Also, the price of land is very high in Namibia, which further complicates the matter.

By 2007, some 12% of the total commercial farmland in the country was taken away from white Namibian farmers and given to black citizens.

=== South Africa ===
South Africa is one of the world's most unequal countries due to the legacy of colonial and apartheid laws that dispossessed black South Africans of their lands and confined most land to the white minority. During apartheid, the best agricultural land was in white-designated areas and white farmers were heavily subsidized whereas black farmers were restricted to low-quality land, overcrowding, and near non-existent subsidies. With the end of apartheid in 1994, the South African black-led government introduced land reforms where the state could buy the land back from farmers at market value in order to return it to claimants who had been dispossessed of their land or provide grants to assist those without a claim of dispossession to purchase land. By 2016, the land reform program had only redistributed 11% of the land. The program has been criticized for inefficiencies, corruption and lack of farmer support, as well as for relying on slow and market-based solutions.

The Natives' Land Act of 1913 "prohibited the establishment of new farming operations, sharecropping or cash rentals by blacks outside of the reserves" where they were forced to live.

In 1991, after a long anti-apartheid struggle led by the African National Congress, State President F. W. de Klerk declared the repeal of several apartheid rules, particularly: the Population Registration Act, the Group Areas Act, and the Natives' Land Act. A catch-all Abolition of Racially Based Land Measures Act was passed. These measures ensured no one could claim, or be deprived of, any land rights on the basis of race.

In 2000 the South African Government decided to review and change the redistribution and tenure process to a more decentralized and area based planning process. The idea is to have local integrated development plans in 47 districts.

=== Zimbabwe ===
The 1930 Land Apportionment Act restricted the areas of Zimbabwe, then known as Southern Rhodesia, where black people could legally purchase land. Large segments of the country were set aside for the exclusive ownership of the white minority.

By 1979, when Zimbabwe gained independence, 46.5% of the country's arable land was owned by around 6,000 commercial farmers, and white farmers, who made up less than 1% of the population, owned 70% of the best farming land.

As part of the Lancaster House Agreement of 1979, president Robert Mugabe initiated a "willing buyer, willing seller" plan, in which white land-owners were encouraged to sell their lands to the government, with partial funding from Britain. Around 71,000 families (perhaps 500,000 people) settled on 3.5 million hectares of former white-owned land under this programme, which was described by "The Economist" in 1989 as "perhaps the most successful aid programme in Africa".

The 1992 Land Acquisition Act was enacted to speed up the land reform process by removing the "willing seller, willing buyer" clause, limiting the size of farms and introducing a land tax (although the tax was never implemented.) The Act empowered the government to buy land compulsorily for redistribution, and a fair compensation was to be paid for land acquired. Landowners could challenge in court the price set by the acquiring authority. Opposition by landowners increased throughout the period of 1992 to 1997. In the 1990s, less than 1 million hectares (2.47 million acres) were acquired, and fewer than 20,000 families were resettled. Much of the land acquired during what has become known as "phase one" of land reform was of poor quality, according to Human Rights Watch. Only 19 percent of the almost 3.5 million hectares (8.65 million acres) of resettled land was considered prime, or farmable.

In 1997, the new British government, led by Tony Blair, unilaterally stopped funding the "willing buyer, willing seller" land reform programme. Britain's ruling Labour Party felt no obligation to continue paying white farmers compensation.

In 2000, a referendum on constitutional amendments was held. The proposed amendments called for a "fast track" land reform and allowed the government to confiscate white-owned land for redistribution to black farmers without compensation. The motion failed with 55% of participants against the referendum. However, self-styled "war veterans", led by Chenjerai Hunzvi, began invading white-owned farms. Those who did not leave voluntarily were often tortured and sometimes killed. On 6 April 2000, Parliament pushed through an amendment, taken word for word from the draft constitution that was rejected by voters, allowing the seizure of white-owned farmlands without due reimbursement or payment. In this first wave of farm invasions, a total of 110,000 square kilometres of land had been seized.

Parliament, dominated by Zanu-PF, passed a constitutional amendment, signed into law on 12 September 2005, that nationalised farmland acquired through the "Fast Track" process and deprived original landowners of the right to challenge in court the government's decision to expropriate their land. The Supreme Court of Zimbabwe ruled against legal challenges to this amendment.

During the "fast track", many parcels of land came under the control of people close to the government. The several forms of forcible change in management caused a severe drop in production and other economic disruptions.

== North America ==
=== Canada ===
A land reform was carried out as part of Prince Edward Island's agreement to join the Canadian Confederation in 1873. Most of the land was owned by absentee landlords in England, and as part of the deal Canada was to buy all the land and give it to the farmers.

=== United States ===
Land reform efforts are greatly limited in the United States due to the provisions of the Fourth Amendment and the Takings Clause of the Fifth Amendment, which inhibit the ability of the state to seize private property. Following the American Civil War, many African Americans and Union Army officials considered land reform vital. The downfall of the Confederacy and the abolition of slavery with the Thirteenth Amendment emancipated millions, but few former slaves had the means to exercise real autonomy. Land, even at depressed post-war prices, was difficult for African Americans to procure. At the same time, with southern wealth the result of centuries of forced labor, blacks nationwide called for property on the basis of just reparations. Politically, redistribution carried the support of Radical Republicans. But opposing any grants to blacks were southern Democrats, along with President Andrew Johnson's administration committed to 'restoration'. Given national divisions, reform efforts were varied but short-lived.

Many African Americans believed property was critical to erasing slave-oriented social order. In addition to speaking out, some demanded plots and moved into their master's plantation homes by force. Others bought land collectively, or squatted on what was undeveloped. Throughout war and Reconstruction, the presence of Federal troops provided a platform for agricultural policy. In 1865, William Tecumseh Sherman issued Field Order 15, taking coastal land in South Carolina, Georgia and Florida, and dividing it into 40-acre plots for black settlement, hence the term "40 acres and a mule".

In March, Congress established the Freedmen's Bureau, whose commissioner had authority to redistribute confiscated or abandoned southern land. The Bureau held 850,000 acres (3,400 km^{2}), and key directors pushed for its settling with former slaves. When President Johnson began to pardon Confederates and restore their property, Commissioner Oliver O. Howard issued Circular 13. The order instructed agents to establish 40-acre parcels with haste. Johnson rescinded the order, and an overwhelming majority of Bureau land returned to its previous owners.

The final reform attempts of Reconstruction occurred within state governments. In South Carolina, a land commission was established, which purchased property and sold it on long-term credit. Other state Republicans utilized new tax systems, penalizing large estates, to seize and divide land and stimulate black ownership. This indirect method achieved little, as taxes were repaid and lands were reclaimed. Of property not redeemed, much was exploited by investors.

Radicals began to fall even earlier, with the failure of Johnson's impeachment. Liberal Republicans, eroding the era's political landscape, called for an immediate end to "black barbarism". White supremacist violence and the Long Depression weakened Reconstruction to the breaking point. With the Compromise of 1877, it was finished.

In the 19th century, Native American tribes owned about 138 million acres (560,000 km^{2}) of land in the USA. Land was considered the property of the whole tribe, which used it to cater to the needs of the individual tribe members. This approach to land ownership was different than the white European approach, which regarded land as private property of individuals.

Many US politicians believed it was important to assimilate Native Americans into white American culture, and thus have their lands open for commerce and development. The Dawes Act (also known as the General Allotment Act or the Dawes Severalty Act), adopted by Congress in 1887, authorized the President of the United States to survey Native American tribal land and divide it into allotments for individual Indians. Those who accepted allotments and lived separately from the tribe would be granted United States citizenship. The Dawes Act was amended in 1891, and again in 1906 by the Burke Act.

Through the Dawes Act, many Indians received private title to a land-plot, but most of the Indian lands were considered "surplus", and put to sale to white European settlers. Thus, the total amount of land owned by Indians decreased to only 48 million acres (190,000 km^{2}) in 1934.

Most tribal land still owned by ethnic Indians was recollectivized in 1934.

== East Asia ==
=== Mainland China ===
In ancient China, according to one study, land reform was “a recognised right of the people; every few years the land was redivided and the people set on a new footing of equality.” Under various emperors, progressive land reforms were carried out that benefited ordinary people. Under the Hongwu Emperor, for instance, large estates were confiscated and redistributed among the poor.

Since the fall of the Qing dynasty in the 1911 Revolution, China has been through an additional series of land reform programs. The founder of the Nationalist Party, Sun Yat-sen, advocated a "land to the tiller" program of equal distribution of land. which was partly implemented by the Nationalist government under Chiang Kai-shek. In the 1940s, the Sino-American Joint Commission on Rural Reconstruction, funded with American money, with the support of the national government, carried out land reform and community action programs in several provinces.

In October 1947, two years before the foundation of the People's Republic of China (PRC), the Chinese Communist Party launched land reform campaigns that established control in North China villages.

In the mid-1950s, a second land reform during the Great Leap Forward compelled individual farmers to join collectives, which, in turn, were grouped into People's communes with centrally controlled property rights and an egalitarian principle of distribution. This policy was generally a failure in terms of production. The PRC reversed this policy in 1962 through the proclamation of the Sixty Articles. As a result, the ownership of the basic means of production was divided into three levels with collective land ownership vested in the production team (see also Ho [2001]).

A third land reform beginning in the late 1970s re-introduced the family-based contract system known as the Household Responsibility System, was followed by a period of stagnation. Chen, Wang, and Davis [1998] suggest that the stagnation was due, in part, to a system of periodic redistributions that encouraged over-exploitation rather than private capital investment in future productivity. However, although land use rights were returned to individual farmers, collective land ownership was left undefined after the disbandment of the People's Communes.

Since 1983, China has launched a series of land policy reforms to improve land-use efficiency, to rationalize land allocation, to enhance land management, and to coordinate urban and rural development. These land policy reforms have yielded positive impacts on urban land use as well as negative socioeconomic consequences. On the positive side, they have contributed to emerging land markets, increased government revenue for the financing of massive infrastructure projects and provision of public goods, and improved the rationalization of land use. On the negative side, problems such as loss of social equity, socioeconomic conflicts, and government corruption have emerged.

Since 1998 China is in the midst of drafting the new Property Law which is the first piece of national legislation that will define the land ownership structure in China for years to come. The Property Law forms the basis for China's future land policy of establishing a system of freehold, rather than of private ownership (see also Ho, [2005]).

=== Taiwan ===
In the 1950s, after the Kuomintang retreat to Taiwan, land reform and community development was carried out by the Sino-American Joint Commission on Rural Reconstruction. This course of action was made attractive, in part, by the fact that many of the large landowners were Japanese who had fled, and the other large landowners were compensated with Japanese commercial and industrial properties seized after Taiwan reverted from Japanese rule in 1945. The land program succeeded also because the Kuomintang were mostly from the mainland and had few ties to the remaining indigenous landowners.

=== Japan ===
A feudal land tenure system was developed in Japan in the 7th and 8th centuries.

The first modern land reform, called the Land Tax Reform or chisokaisei (地租改正), passed in 1873, six years after the Meiji Restoration. It established the right of private land ownership in Japan for the first time and was a major restructuring of the previous land taxation system.

The government initially ordered individual farmers to measure the plots of their land themselves, calculate their taxes, and submit the results to local tax officials. However, difficulties arose with the honesty of the measuring system and the government responded by forcefully changing land values to meet the set amount if self-reported values did not meet projected values. This caused widespread resentment among farmers and several large-scale riots, causing the government to lower the tax rate from 3% to 2.5%. The department continued its aggressive taxation until 1878, but the strictness of rules gradually decreased as it became clear that required amounts would be met. By 1880, seven years after the start of the land reforms, the new system had been completely implemented.

Private land ownership was recognized for the first time in Japan with the issuing of land titles. Previously, individual farmers were merely borrowing the land from feudal lords, who in turn were borrowing the land from the emperor. The reform abolished this archaic system of land ownership, and began to allow landowners to use their property as a financial asset in collateral or other investment. This law was one of the first steps towards the development of capitalism in Japan, paralleling the English (and later United Kingdom) statute Quia Emptores enacted several centuries earlier.

Another major land reform was carried out in 1947, during the occupied era after World War II, under instructions of the Supreme Commander of the Allied Powers based on a proposal from the Japanese government which had been prepared before the defeat of the Greater Japanese Empire. This last reform is also called Nōchi-kaihō (農地解放; emancipation of farming land).

Between 1947 and 1949, approximately 5,800,000 acres (23,000 km^{2}) of land (approximately 38% of Japan's cultivated land) was purchased from the landlords under the reform program and re-sold at extremely low prices (after inflation) to the farmers who worked them. By 1950, three million peasants had acquired land, dismantling a power structure that the landlords had long dominated.

=== South Korea ===
From 1945 to 1950, United States Army Military Government in Korea and First Republic of Korea authorities carried out a land reform that retained the institution of private property. They confiscated and redistributed all land held by the Japanese colonial government, Japanese companies, and individual Japanese colonists. The Korean government carried out a reform whereby Koreans with large landholdings were obliged to divest most of their land. A new class of independent, family proprietors was created.

=== North Korea ===
By the end of the Second World War, 58% of arable land in North Korea was privately owned by Japanese colonists and Korean feudal landlords comprising 4% of the population. On March 5, 1946, the North Korean Provisional People's Committee enacted the 1946 Land Reform Law whereby both Japanese colonists would have their entire estate expropriated and Korean landlords in possession of more than 50,000 square meters of land would have their estates expropriated and distributed to existing tenant farmers for free, abolishing the existing tenant farming system. In just one month, the Provisional People's Committee of North Korea and the Workers' Party of North Korea led land reform by organizing 90,697 members into 11,500 farming committees. They organized 210,000 farmers into self-defense forces who supported the work of the farming committees. During three weeks of land reform, 98 percent of confiscated land was distributed to farmers who in turn became the possessors of up to 13,200 square meters of land and over one million hectares of land were expropriated. The early land reform may have been partially intended to prepare for the Korean War by improving the South Korean public's perception of the Communist government in the north as well as by providing large stockpiles of food.

During the 1954-58 transition period, farm holdings went through three progressively collective phases: permanent mutual aid teams; semisocialist cooperatives; and complete socialist cooperatives. In the final stage, all land and farm implements were owned collectively by the members of each cooperative. The pace of collectivization quickened during 1956, and by the end of that year, about 80% of all farmland was cooperatively owned. By August 1958, more than 13,300 cooperatives with an average of eighty households and 130 hectares of land dotted the countryside. In October 1958, the Workers' Party of Korea government increased the size of the average cooperative to 300 households managing 500 hectares of land through consolidation of all farms in each village.

== Southeast Asia ==
=== Cambodia ===
Hun Sen implemented land reform, the "leopard skin land reform", in Cambodia. Hun Sen's government has been responsible for leasing 45% of the total landmass in Cambodia—primarily to foreign investors—in the years 2007–08, threatening more than 150,000 Cambodians with eviction. Parts of the concessions are protected wildlife areas or national parks and have driven deforestation across the country. As of 2015, Cambodia had one of the highest rates of forest loss in the world. The land sales have been perceived by observers as government corruption and have resulted in thousands of citizens being forcibly evicted. According to Alice Beban, the land reform strengthened patronage politics in Cambodia and did not enable land tenure security.

=== Philippines ===
Land reform initiatives in the Philippines in the 20th Century responds to a longer history of the concentration of land control in the hands of an elite few, a legacy rooted in the country's colonial history. Spanish colonization turned all lands into the property of the Spanish crown through the force of violence. In the 19th Century, large landholdings were turned into haciendas privately owned by landed classes for the purpose of commercial export agriculture. American colonial rule further solidified this land regime.

Rural inequality and injustice spurred the rise of Filipino peasant movements in the early 20th Century, culminating in the Huk rebellion in the 1940s and 1950s. The Huks championed land redistribution for the landless peasant, a demand also pushed by the communist armed insurgency that peaked in the 1970s and 1980s. Pacifying agrarian unrest became one of the motivations for government efforts to pursue various land reform initiatives, yet successive programs have failed to substantively fulfill the peasant clamor for land. The Macapagal administration initiated a limited land reform program in the early 1960s covering rice fields in Central Luzon.

During the martial law era of the Ferdinand Marcos Administration, Presidential Decree 27, signed in 1972, instituted a land reform program that covered rice and corn lands. But by the fall of Marcos in 1986, this program redistributed less than 14 percent of cultivated lands. Rice production was supported by the Marcos Administration with an agricultural program known as the Masagana 99 that promoted chemical-dependent high-yielding varieties of rice. However, costly subsidies and a faulty credit scheme led to the program benefiting only 3.7 percent of the country's small rice farmers by 1980.

The Corazon Aquino Administration enacted the Comprehensive Agrarian Reform Program (CARP), an ambitious land redistribution program that covered all agricultural lands, on June 10, 1988. CARP has been criticized by agrarian reform advocates for various loopholes and weaknesses that allowed landowners to evade land redistribution. Landowners have resorted to leaseback arrangements, land-use conversions, and protracted legal battles to retain control over landed properties.

Despite the program's flaws, strong pressure from peasant movements, especially in the 1990s, resulted in the implementation of significant yet partial land redistribution of about half of all agricultural land to three-fifths of all agricultural households in the Philippines under CARP. However, many of these redistributive gains have been reversed by aggressive corporate land-grabbing, inadequate government support for agrarian reform beneficiaries, and increasing violence and criminalization against land reform claimants.

The year 1998 was the original 10-year deadline for the implementation of CARP, but this was extended to the end of December 2008. The passage of the Comprehensive Agrarian Reform Program Extension with Reforms (CARPER) in 2009 extended the program by five more years. After the lapse of the deadline on June 30, 2014, no new landholdings will be issued with notices for coverage (NOCs) for redistribution. However, landholdings that were already issued NOCs before the 2014 deadline will continue to be processed for land redistribution. CARP remains unfinished more than three decades after its enactment.

=== Thailand ===
Thailand first spoke of land reform after the Siamese revolution of 1932 by Pridi Banomyong, but was seen as a communist idea. And it was mentioned again after the 1973 Thai popular uprising, resulting in the drafting and promulgation the Agricultural Land Reform Act of 1975 and the Agricultural Land Reform Office was established on March 6, 1975. under the Ministry of Agriculture and Cooperatives.

=== Vietnam ===
In the years after World War II, land redistribution to poor and landless peasants was initiated by the communist Viet Minh insurgents in areas which they controlled. After the partition of the country into two parts (North Vietnam and South Vietnam) under the Geneva Accords, the communist land reform (1953–1956) redistributed land to more than 2 million poor peasants, but at a cost of thousands, possibly tens of thousands of lives and contributed to the exodus of up to 1 million people from the North to the South in 1954 and 1955.. The land reform campaign was accompanied by large-scale repression and excesses. some of which were subsequently criticized within the ruling Workers' Party of North Vietnam itself.

South Vietnam made several further attempts in the post-Diem years, the most ambitious being the Land to the Tiller program instituted in 1970 by President Nguyen Van Thieu. This limited individuals to 15 hectares, compensated the owners of expropriated tracts, and extended legal title to peasants who in areas under control of the South Vietnamese government to whom had land had previously been distributed by the Viet Cong.

== Summary table ==
The following table summarizes many land reforms that are not mentioned in this page. The color in the "Year" column is darker for earlier periods and brighter for later periods.

Region/place	Reformer	Year	Ideology / motivations	Actions	Outcomes
Middle East: Egypt	Joseph	−1500	Monarchism: Strengthen the Pharaoh	Nationalization; Joseph bought all lands for Pharaoh	Egyptian peasants became serfs of Pharaoh
Middle East: Egypt	Bakenranef	−720	Social Justice: Help the peasants	Freedom to peasants; Land alienability; Debt annulment	Bakenranef murdered, reforms undone
Europe: Greece / Athens	Solon	−575	Stabilization: Help the poor; Prevent an uprising	Freedom to peasants; Debt annulment; Forbid slavery of Athenians	poverty somewhat alleviated
Europe: Greece / Athens	Peisistratos	−560	Centralization: Help the poor; strengthening the tyrant	Land redistribution from rich to poor	Athenian aristocracy weakened, poverty somewhat reduced
Europe: Greece / Sparta	Agis IV, Cleomenes III	−244– −227	Centralization: Help the poor; strengthening the army	Land redistribution; Debt annulment	Reformer kings murdered by opponents, reforms undone
Europe: Italy / Rome	Gracchi brothers	−133– −121	Social Justice: Help the landless soldiers	Land redistribution; Enforcement of land ceiling law	Reformer tribunes murdered by Senate, reforms undone
Europe: Austria / Habsburg monarchy	Maria Theresa and Joseph II	1680–1790	Enlightenment: Liberate peasants; increase tax revenues	Freedom to peasants: Abolish serfdom duties	nobles did not cooperate and laws were not enforced
Europe: France / Savoy	Victor Amadeus II, National Assembly	1720–1793	Economics: Increase royal income; Enlightenment: Weaken the nobility; Liberate peasants	Freedom to peasants: Abolish serfdom duties; Abolish feudal rents; Confiscate lands from lords	Royalty executed. All estates were at least partially emancipated. Most peasant populations refused to respect state confiscation and demanded the land themselves.
Europe: Prussia	various	1763–1850	Economics: Modernize the state by improving the peasants' conditions	Freedom to peasants from serfdom duties: Enable serfs to become free landlords	nobles bought much more land than peasants
Europe: Italy / Sicily	various	1773–1865	Enlightenment: Liberate the peasants and strengthen the king	Nationalize noble lands: Reduce duties of peasants to landlords; Abolish private landlord armies; Distribute common lands to poor peasants.	The rich bought most lands and became richer; the Sicilian Mafia was born.
Europe: Austria / Austrian empire	Constituent Assembly	1849	Enlightenment: Liberate peasants	Freedom to peasants; subsidized purchase of their lands	feudal law abolished, but most land remained concentrated with the nobles
Latin America: Mexico	Miguel Lerdo, Porfirio Díaz	1856–1910	Liberalism and economics	Forced sale of corporately held property, specifically lands held by the Catholic Church and indigenous communities.	Changed the nature of land tenure in Mexico. Most native-owned land was acquired by large estates. 95% of villages lost their lands.
Europe: Russia / Russian empire	Alexander II	1861	Enlightenment: Liberate peasants	Freedom to peasants; subsidized purchase of their lands	More than 23 million people received their liberty, but many of them received land insufficient for survival and became proletariat
Europe: Britain / Ireland	William Ewart Gladstone, UK government	1870–1922	Social justice: Historic justice to Irish natives	Land transfer from large English landlords to their Irish tenants, funded by UK government	By 1922, over 90% of lands had been transferred
Europe: Russia / Russian empire	Stolypin	1906–1916	Economics: Encourage private property and capitalism	Liquidize communal villages; Divide lands to individual peasants.	Private land holdings increased, but reforms were reversed after Soviet revolution
Latin America: Mexico (after revolution)	Álvaro Obregón, Lázaro Cárdenas	1910–1940	Social justice: Decentralization; Lessening inequality	Allocate land to peasants in need of it	Reversed the process of land concentration, reduced the power and legitimacy of the landlord class. Much land was allocated to peasants. Production increased.
Europe: Russia / Soviet union	Lenin	1917	Communism: Abolish private property	Private ownership of land was prohibited	Private land holdings increased, but reforms were reversed after Soviet revolution
Europe: Albania / Albania	Post-WW2 government	1946	Social justice: Lessening inequality	Constitutional Reforms: Land to the tiller; Disallowed large estates	By 1954, more than 90% of land was held in small and mid-sized farms.
Southeast Asia: Philippines	various	1972–present	Social justice: Lessening inequality	Land redistribution laws	Partial but significant land redistribution to landless peasants, but inadequate support for beneficiaries did not result in improved agricultural production. Agrarian reform remains unfinished.
East Asia: Taiwan	Chiang Monlin, Y.C. James Yen	1950s	Modernization: Community development	Established the JCRR: Agricultural development programs; Co-operative formation; Rural credit programs	The JCRR is credited with laying the agricultural basis for Taiwan's outstanding economic growth in the following decades
Middle East: Egypt	Nasser	1952–1961	Social justice: Lessening inequality	Land redistribution	15% of arable land redistributed; reforms undone after change of government
Southeast Asia: Vietnam / North	Hồ Chí Minh	1953–1956	Communism: Break the power of the traditional village elite	Landlords were murdered by government; Land redistributed to peasants	Thousands were killed, and 1 million people fled to the South
Latin America: Guatemala	Juan José Arévalo, Jacobo Árbenz	1953–1954	Social justice: Lessening inequality	Expropriation of land; Redistribution to peasants	The reform itself was successful, but a later US-backed coup reversed it entirely.
Latin America: Bolivia	Víctor Paz Estenssoro, Evo Morales	1953–2006	Social justice: Expanding indigenous rights	Abolished forced peasantry labor; Distribute rural property of traditional landlords to indigenous peasants; Organized peasants into armed militias.	By 1970, 45% of peasant families had received title to land. The reform goes on.
Europe: Albania / Albania	Enver Hoxha	1958–1962	Communism: Collectivization drive	Most agricultural lands were shifted to Soviet-style collective and state farms.	By 1971, independent family farms had virtually disappeared
Latin America: Cuba	Che Guevara	1959–1963	Communism	Nationalization of large estates; Redistribution to peasants; Land ceiling	Peasants were given land rights, but these rights are constrained by government production quotas and a prohibition of real estate transactions
South Asia: India	Hare Krishna Konar, E. M. S. Namboodiripad and others	1961–	Economics: Modernize the agriculture; End the exploitation of the poor	Abolition of rent-collectors; Secure land-tenure; Land ceiling; Consolidate disparate holdings.	In parts of India redistribution of land became more equitable; in other parts, people found loopholes in ceiling laws.
Latin America: Chile	Jorge Alessandri	1962–1973	Social justice: Lessening Inequality	Nationalization of large estates; Redistribution to peasants	After the 1973 coup the process was halted and somewhat reversed by the coup
Southeast Asia: Vietnam / South	Nguyen Van Thieu	1970	Social welfare: Gain support from rural population during the Vietnam War.	Land ceiling; Land redistribution with compensation to previous landlords	Land was redistributed, but law became meaningless 5 years later at the fall of Saigon.
Africa: Ethiopia	DERG	1975	Social justice: Lessening inequality	Nationalization of large estates; Redistribution to peasants; abolished tenancy	End of feudal law, strengthening of peasants
Oceania: Australia	various	1976–2004	Social justice: Historic justice to Indigenous Australians	Several laws giving land rights to Aboriginals	Large lands have been returned to Aboriginals
Europe: Albania / Albania	Post-communist government	1991	Privatization: Allow private property	Arable land held in cooperatives; State-owned farms were equally distributed among rural households.	Land was privatized.
Europe: Russia / Russian Federation	GorbachevYeltsinPutin	1989–2001	Privatization: Allow private property	Private ownership of land was re-allowed in several stages	Private ownership gradually increased, but became centralized into the hands of Russian oligarchs
Latin America: Venezuela	Hugo Chávez	2001–2003	Social justice: Lessening inequality	Redistribute government and unused private land to campesinos in need	60K families received land title
Europe: Britain / Scotland	Scottish Parliament	2003	Social justice: Freedom to farmer communities	Farmer communities can buy their lands without landlord consent	End of feudal law

== See also ==
- Anti-globalization movement
- Communism
- Eminent domain
- Georgism
- Homestead principle
- Inclosure
- Land Banking
- Land claim
- Land reform
- Land Reform in Developing Countries
- Land rights
- Land value tax
- Landless Workers Movement
- Open field system
- Restitution
- Squatter
