= Land reform in Sicily =

Land reforms were attempted in Sicily since the 18th century. Their goal was to free the peasants from the bondages of feudalism, but currently they are regarded as one of the main causes for the rise of the Sicilian Mafia.

== In the Kingdom of Sicily ==
Under feudalism, the nobility owned most of the land. They enforced law and order through their private armies, which were also used to keep unruly workers and tenants in line.

In 1773, in the Palermo revolt, guilds (maestranza) urged peasants to apply for the nationalized lands of the Jesuits. in 1781-1786, Viceroy Caracciolo ruled that the fiefs of nobles now belong to the king. He also declared that private armies are illegal. Peasant obligations to lords were reduced.

In 1789, an edict called for enclosure of common lands, to be distributed to the poor in copyhold in exchange for yielding some of their feudal rights. However, most peasants were too poor to buy their rights, and the laws could be interpreted and enforced only by local magistrates. As a result, the rich became richer and the poor became poorer. A rural proletariat was created.

After 1812, the feudal barons steadily sold off or rented their lands to private citizens. Primogeniture was abolished, land could no longer be seized to settle debts, and one fifth of the land was to become private property of the peasants.

Feudalism was ended in the early 1900s but "the existing structure was even reinforced. The implementation of the law brought about a worsening of the position of the peasants, who, although legally free, were excluded from any form of landownership."

== In the Kingdom of Italy ==
In the 1860s, After Italy annexed Sicily in the Italian unification wars, it redistributed a large share of public and church land to private citizens.

Some scholars claim that the unification forces did not favor land reform, and with little benefit to them, the peasants rebelled. The insurrection was put down in 1865, killing 5000 peasants.

Other scholars claim that, on the contrary, the redistribution resulted in a huge boom in landowners: from 2,000 in 1812 to 20,000 by 1861. Anton Blok however writes that "the number of large landowners increased through gabellotti (stewards or agents of a sort) acquiring part of their masters' property" and despite the antagonisms between "the old aristocracy and the rising rural bourgeoisie..., their interests coincided quite definitely on one point; excluding the contadini (peasants) from landownership and preventing agrarian reforms at any price."

With this increase in property owners and commerce came more disputes that needed settling, contracts that needed enforcing, transactions that needed oversight, and properties that needed protecting. The barons were releasing their private armies to let the state take over the job of enforcing the law, but the new authorities were not up to the task, largely due to their inexperience with capitalism. Lack of manpower was also a problem: there were often less than 350 active policemen for the entire island. Some towns did not have any permanent police force, only visited every few months by some troops to collect malcontents, leaving criminals to operate with impunity from the law in the interim. Compounding these problems was banditry: rising food prices, the loss of public and church lands, and the loss of feudal commons pushed many desperate peasants to steal. In the face of rising crime, booming commerce, and inefficient authorities, property owners turned to extralegal arbitrators and protectors. These extralegal protectors would eventually organize themselves into the first Sicilian Mafia clans.

In 1876 Leopoldo Franchetti and Sidney Costantino, Baron Sonnino wrote a report on land conditions in Sicily and "Particularly in the western part of the interior of the island they found the land concentrated in a very small number of hands, a peasant population which was almost entirely dependent on a relatively small number of landowners or agents, and a system of regressive taxation: draught animals (the property of the contadini) were taxed, but not the cattle and sheep of the landowners and gabellotti."

== In the Republic of Italy ==
Writing about land tenure in Genuardo in 1947, Anton Blok indicates that the land is of poor quality "The soil seems mostly unsuited for olives, almonds and grapes" and "Not all the land belongs to Genuardesi; the greater part is held by owners living in Palermo and in surrounding villages" and "Of the 5,000 ha., on which Genuardesi work (the rest of the territory is not discussed here) more than two-thirds is owned by two latifondisti (large estate-owners) with 1,000 and 2,000 ha., respectively." The rest are split with "medium-sized holdings (10-200 ha.,) belonging to well-to-do farmers. Finally there are some hundreds of small plots ranging from 0.5 to 10 ha., belonging to contadini, most of whom have more than one piece of land." These plots were disparately spread out due to inheritance laws which split land equally between children. Even though some contadini own land it is not enough for a livelihood and "the work they do as share-croppers on the latifondi forms the basis of their subsistence." Agents of landowners, gabellotto, let small plots of land, perhaps 5 hectares in size, to sharecroppers on an annual basis and provide seed with cultivation by any equipment share-croppers own. Braccianti perform annual harvest work when intensive labour is needed. "After the harvest the gabellotto first takes the sowingseed from the crop and the rest is divided in three parts: two for the gabellotto and one for the peasant. From his share the latter still has to yield one tumolo (14 kg.) to the campiere (latifondoguard)....Most share-croppers are left with a fourth or a fifth of their crop; in the case of a bad harvest they end the year in debt to the gabellotto. To make ends meet they are forced to steal."
