= Land reform in Athens =

Two major land reforms were attempted at ancient Athens in the 6th century BC.

== Background ==
Already in the 8th century BC, Hesiod referred to land shortage related to the problems of dividing inheritance. In the Odyssey it is mentioned that the worst fate of a man, other than death, is to remain without land and thus have to serve another person. People with no land had to leave Athens and settle in colonies in the west (Sicily and Italy) and east (Asia Minor).

By the end of the 7th century and beginning of 6th century BC, land concentration occurred and most lands were held by the nobility. Athenians with small farms could not survive dry years, so they had to borrow from the rich and pay a yearly usury of about 1/6 of the yearly crop. This high usury left them little money to return the loan, so the debts could not be paid and the poor actually became serfs to the rich. Some of them were even sold abroad as slaves (since it was forbidden to sell Athenians as slaves in Athens).

== Solon's reforms ==
By the end of the 7th century BC, embitterment among the poor had risen, and the rich had begun to fear an uprising which might lead to tyranny as often happened in other Greek poleis. Hence, in 594 BC, both sides agreed to elect Solon, who was considered wise and impartial, as the archon to arbitrate the dispute.

Solon decided on the following reforms:

- Free all land-owners from the obligation to pay 1/6 to their loaners;
- Cancel all debts;
- Forbid selling a debtor as a slave to pay the debt;
- Forbid selling Athenians to slavery abroad;
- Buy back all Athenians that were already sold;
- Revise and cancel most of the Draconian constitution.

To appease the rich, Solon divided the Athenians into four income groups, with civil rights increasing from the lower to the higher income.

=== Outcomes ===
No group in Athens were thoroughly satisfied:

- Athenians who had to sell their land to pay their debts did not get their land back and remained poor;
- Freed slaves had no land and could not support themselves;
- The poor did not win equal civil rights;
- The rich of course were not satisfied with the cancellation of debts.

However, they agreed to live by the new laws for about 100 years, and during this time, the poverty in Athens had been somewhat alleviated.

== Pisistratus' reforms ==
At about 560 BC, continuing unrest led to the tyranny of Pisistratus. There are differing opinions regarding his land reforms:

- Some claim he really cared about the poor, so he confiscated lands from the rich and gave them to the landless, while also offering cheap loans to small farmers so that they wouldn't have to sell their lands in tough years.
- Others claim he confiscated only a small amount of land belonging mainly to his political foes.

=== Outcomes ===
The power of aristocracy in Athens was reduced, poverty was somewhat reduced, agriculture and other crafts were promoted.

== See also ==
- Land reform in Sparta

== Sources ==
- Powelson, John (1987). The Story of Land - [A World History of Land Tenure and Agrarian Reform]. Cambridge, MA, USA: Lincoln Institute of Land Policy. pp. 27–28. ISBN 0899462189.
