= Common rights =

Common rights may refer to:

- Rights to use common land in a particular way
- Natural rights, universal rights that are not dependent on the customs of any particular culture
- Human rights, freedoms or entitlements widely recognized as belonging to all humans
- Group rights, rights held by a group as a whole rather than individually by its members
