= 1922 Land Code =

First major land regulation code in the RSFSR

The 1922 Land Code of the RSFSR (Russian: Земельный кодекс, Zemelniy kodeks) was the first principal document that systemized land legislation in the Russian Soviet Federative Socialist Republic. It was adopted at the 4th session of the All-Russian Central Executive Committee (VTsIK) and carried into effect on December 1, 1922.

The 1922 Land Code was elaborated under the supervision and with the direct participation of Vladimir Lenin. The main purpose of the code was to regulate the land tenure by rural communities. Similar land codes were adopted by other republics of the Soviet Union between 1922 and 1929. After the universal agricultural collectivization, land codes of the Soviet republics lost their significance.

In 1970–1971, the Soviet Union adopted new land codes in all of the republics. The 1970 Land Code of the RSFSR was adopted on December 1, 1970.

In modern Russia the 2001 Land Code of the Russian Federation (Земельный кодекс Российской Федерации от 25 октября 2001 г. N 136-ФЗ), with a number of later amendments, is in effect.

== See also ==
- Decree on Land
