= Land reform in ancient Egypt =

Land ownership in ancient Egypt cycled between private, monarchical, and feudal. A strong king could take advantage of harsh situations such as famine, buy lands from private owners and make them the property of the crown. A weaker king would have to buy services from strong lords by giving them gifts of land.

Bakenranef, a king of the Twenty-fourth Dynasty who ruled Sais around 725 BCE, has been credited with initiating a land reform program. The tradition of Bakenranef as a great lawgiver dates back to the ancient historian Diodorus Siculus, but the brevity of Bakenranef's reign and the small geographical extent of the area he ruled, together with the indirect character of the historical evidence for it, has cast some doubt upon this.

== See also ==
- Ancient Egyptian agriculture
