= Land reform in Albania =

Albania has gone through three waves of the land reform since the end of World War II:

- In 1946, the land in estates and large farms was expropriated by the communist government and redistributed among small peasants;
- In the 1950s, the land was reorganized into large-scale collective farms;
- After 1991, the land was again redistributed among private smallholders.

== Background ==
At the end of World War II, the farm structure in Albania was characterized by high concentration of land in large farms. In 1945, farms larger than 10 hectares (25 acres), representing numerically a mere 3% of all farms in the country, managed 27% of agricultural land and just seven large estates (out of 155,000 farms) controlled 4% of agricultural land, averaging more than 2,000 hectares (4,900 acres) each, compared to the average farm size of 2.5 hectares (6.2 acres) at that time.

== Land-to-the-tiller reform ==
The first post-war constitution of independent Albania (March 1946) declared that land belonged to the tiller and that large estates under no circumstances could be owned by private individuals (article 10). The post-war land reform of 1946 redistributed 155,000 hectares (40% of the land stock) from 19,355 relatively large farms (typically larger than 5 hectares) to 70,211 small farms and landless households. As a result, the share of large farms with more than 10 hectares declined from 27% of agricultural land in 1945 to 3% in 1954. By 1954, more than 90% of land was held in small and mid-sized farms of between 1 hectare and 10 hectares.

== Collectivization reform ==
The distributive effects of the post-war land reform were eliminated by the collectivization drive of the late 1950s-early 1960s, and by 1962 less than 18% of agricultural land had remained in family farms and household plots, while the rest had shifted to Soviet-style collective and state farms). By 1971, independent family farms had virtually disappeared and individual farming survived only in household plots cultivated part-time by cooperative members (approximately 6% of agricultural land).

== Privatization reform ==
The post-communist land reform begun in 1991 as part of the transition to the market was in effect a replay of the 1946 land reform, and the arable land held in cooperatives and state farms was equally distributed among all rural households without regard to pre-communist ownership rights.

Contrary to other transition countries in Central and Eastern Europe, Albania adopted a distributive land reform (like the CIS) and did not restitute land to former owners. The post-communist land reform of the 1990s was accompanied by special land privatization legislation, as Albania was the only country outside the former Soviet Union that had nationalized all agricultural land (in stages between 1946 and 1976).
