= Decree on Land =

1917 decree of the Soviet Union

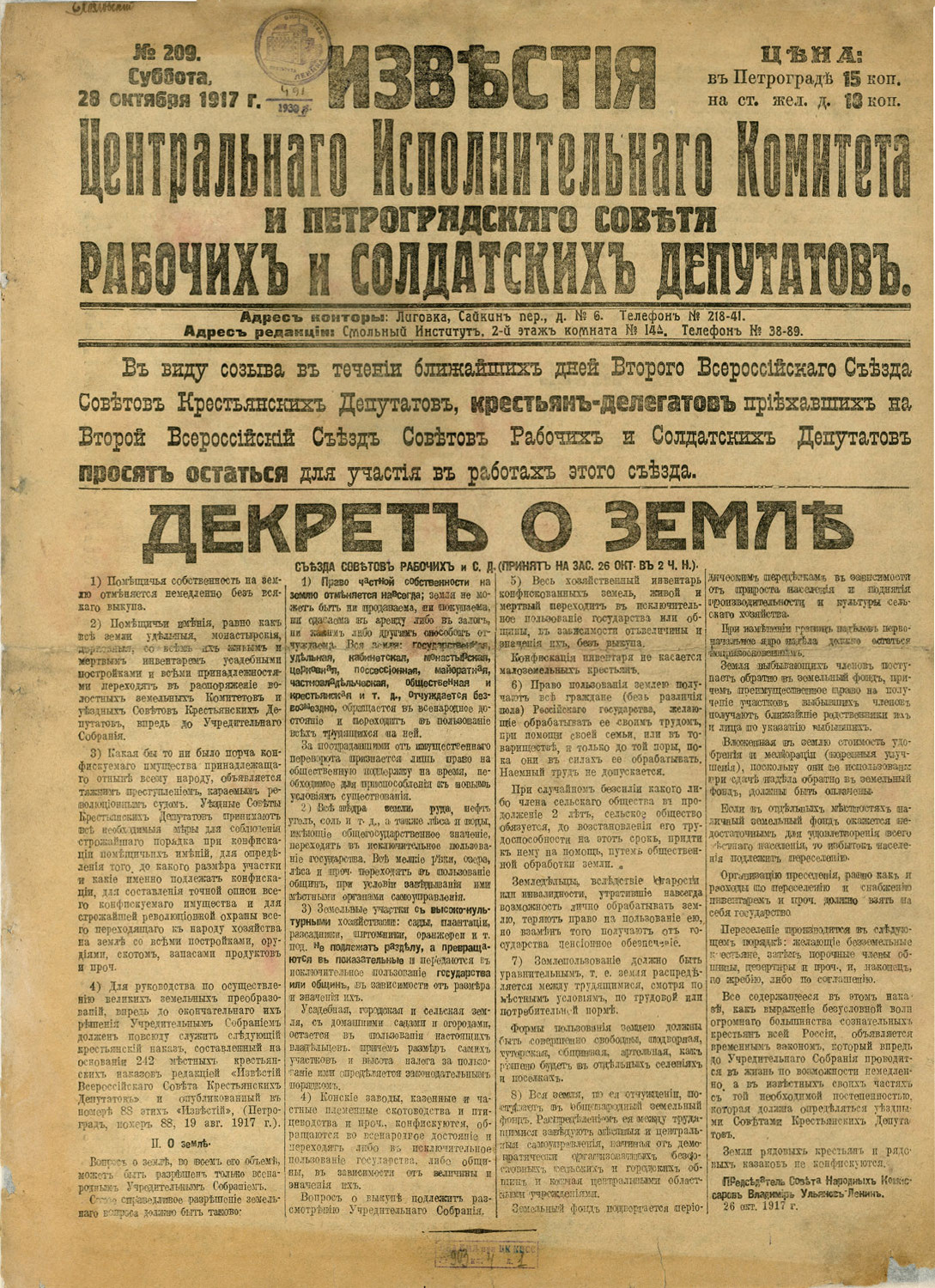
Decree on Land title page

The Decree on Land (Russian: Декретъ о землѣ), written by Vladimir Lenin, was passed by the Second All-Russian Congress of Soviets of Workers' and Soldiers' Deputies on 8 November [O.S. 26 October] 1917, following the success of the October Revolution.

It decreed an abolition of private property, and the redistribution of the landed estates amongst the peasantry. According to the Decree on Land, the peasants had seized the lands of the nobility, monasteries and Church. This decree was followed on February 19, 1918, by a decree of the Central Executive Committee of the All-Russian Congress of Soviets, "The Fundamental Law of Land Socialization". These decrees were amended by the 1922 Land Code.

== Extracts ==
(1) Landed proprietorship is abolished forthwith without any compensation.

(2) The landed estates, as also all crown, monastery, and church lands, with all their livestock, implements, buildings and everything pertaining thereto, shall be placed at the disposal of the volost land committees and the uyezd Soviets of Peasants' Deputies pending the convocation of the Constituent Assembly.

(3) All damage to confiscated property, which henceforth belongs to the whole people, is proclaimed a grave crime to be punished by the revolutionary courts. The uyezd Soviets of Peasants' Deputies shall take all necessary measures to assure the observance of the strictest order during the confiscation of the landed estates, to determine the size of estates, and the particular estates subject to confiscation, to draw up exact inventories of all property confiscated and to protect in the strictest revolutionary way all agricultural enterprises transferred to the people, with all buildings, implements, livestock, stocks of produce, etc.

(4) The following peasant Mandate, compiled by the newspaper Izvestia Vserossiiskogo Soveta Krestyanskikh Deputatov from 242 local peasant mandates and published in No. 88 of that paper (Petrograd, No. 88, August 19, 1917), shall serve everywhere to guide the implementation of the great land reforms until a final decision on the latter is taken by the Constituent Assembly.

Peasant Mandate on the Land

"The land question in its full scope can be settled only by the popular Constituent Assembly.

The most equitable settlement of the land question is to be as follows:

(1) Private ownership of land shall be abolished forever; land shall not be sold, purchased, leased, mortgaged, or otherwise alienated.

All land, whether state, crown, monastery, church, factory, entailed, private, public, peasant, etc., shall be confiscated without compensation and become the property of the whole people, and pass into the use of all those who cultivate it.

Persons who suffer by this property revolution shall be deemed to be entitled to public support only for the period necessary for adaptation to the new conditions of life.

(2) All mineral wealth ? ore, oil, coal, salt, etc., and also all forests and waters of state importance, shall pass into the exclusive use of the state. All the small streams, lakes, woods, etc., shall pass into the use of the communes, to be administered by the local self-government bodies.

(3) Lands on which high-level scientific farming is practised ? orchards, tree-farms, seed plots, nurseries, hothouses, etc. ? shall not be divided up, but shall be converted into model farms, to be turned over for exclusive use to the state or to the communes, depending on the size and importance of such lands.

Household land in towns and villages, with orchards and vegetable gardens, shall be reserved for the use of their present owners, the size of the holdings, and the size of tax levied for the use thereof, to be determined by law.

(4) Stud farms, government and private pedigree stock and poultry farms, etc., shall be confiscated and become the property of the whole people, and pass into the exclusive use of the state or a commune, depending on the size and importance of such farms.

The question of compensation shall be examined by the Constituent Assembly.

(5) All livestock and farm implements of the confiscated estates shall pass into the exclusive use of the state or a commune, depending on their size and importance, and no compensation shall be paid for this.

The farm implements of peasants with little land shall not be subject to confiscation.

(6) The right to use the land shall be accorded to all citizens of the Russian state (without distinction of sex) desiring to cultivate it by their own labour, with the help of their families, or in partnership, but only as long as they are able to cultivate it. The employment of hired labour is not permitted.

In the event of the temporary physical disability of any member of a village commune for a period of up to two years, the village commune shall be obliged to assist him for this period by collectively cultivating his land until he is again able to work.

Peasants who, owing to old age or ill-health, are permanently disabled and unable to cultivate the land personally, shall lose their right to the use of it but, in return, shall receive a pension from the state.

(7) Land tenure shall be on an equality basis, i.e., the land shall be distributed among the working people in conformity with a labour standard or a subsistence standard, depending on local conditions.

There shall be absolutely no restriction on the forms of land tenure ? household, farm, communal, or co-operative, as shall be decided in each individual village and settlement.

(8) All land, when alienated, shall become part of the national land fund. Its distribution among the peasants shall be in charge of the local and central self-government bodies, from democratically organised village and city communes, in which there are no distinctions of social rank, to central regional government bodies.

The land fund shall be subject to periodical redistribution, depending on the growth of population and the increase in the productivity and the scientific level of farming.

When the boundaries of allotments are altered, the original nucleus of the allotment shall be left intact.

The land of the members who leave the commune shall revert to the land fund; preferential right to such land shall be given to the near relatives of the members who have left, or to persons designated by the latter.

The cost of fertilisers and improvements put into the land, to the extent that they have not been fully used up at the time the allotment is returned to the land fund, shall be compensated.

Should the available land fund in a particular district prove inadequate for the needs of the local population, the surplus population shall be settled elsewhere.

The state shall take upon itself the organisation of resettlement and shall bear the cost thereof, as well as the cost of supplying implements, etc.

Resettlement shall be effected in the following order: landless peasants desiring to resettle, then members of the commune who are of vicious habits, deserters, and so on, and, finally, by lot or by agreement."

== See also ==
- Agriculture of the Soviet Union
- Soviet Russia Constitution of 1918
- Real property
- Common good
