= Land reform in the Austrian Empire =

Land reforms were done in the Austrian Empire following the liberal revolutions of 1848.

In 1849, the newly elected Constituent Assembly gave the peasants title to their holdings with no further obligation to the landlords (this is in contrast to the previous Land reform in the Habsburg monarchy, which sought to liberate the peasants but required them to pay rents). Differences in types of tenure were eliminated, and the distinction between noble and peasant land was obliterated. Nobles were also released from any obligation to the peasants.

The redemption price on land was set at 20 times its annual revenue. The peasant would pay 1/3, the government 1/3, and the landlord would lose 1/3.

== Outcomes ==
The reform ended the feudalism in all the Habsburg lands. However, the distribution of land were still unequal. 73% of arable land still belonged to the nobility, 8% to the bourgeoisie, and only 19% to the peasantry.
