= Land reform in Savoy =

The land reforms done in the Duchy of Savoy, beginning at 1720, was the first land reform that emancipated peasants in France from the bondages of Feudalism.

== Background ==
During the Middle Ages, most lands in Savoy, as in most of Europe, were owned by Feudal lords. Peasants were bound to their lords by heavy duties. The mainmorte system allowed a lord to inherit all the property of a peasant who died childless. This caused the estates of the lords to grow larger and larger. Both peasants and lords had little incentives to invest in agricultural or industrial improvements.

== Course ==
In 1720, Victor Amadeus II of Sardinia, the duke of Savoy, had financial problems. To increase his income, he expropriated all estates held by lords who could not produce title to their lands. Subsequently, he began levying taxes on the nobility. These were the first steps in reducing the power of the feudal lords.

His son Charles Emmanuel III continued his reforms, and in 1762 he abolished all mainmorte on the royal estates and personal mainmorte on private estates. In 1771 he also abolished real-estate mainmorte on private estates. In this year he also declared that all duties of peasants towards their lords could be redeemed on terms to be set by negotiation between peasant and seigneur. If no agreement was reached, the duke himself would set the terms. This provision gave leverage to the peasants.

Negotiations were long and slow, but by 1792, when the French Revolution came to Savoy, all estates had been at least partially emancipated. At 1793, the Revolutionary Government of France declared full emancipation with no further redemption price.

== See also ==
- Abolition of feudalism in France
