= Land reform in the Habsburg monarchy =

Land reforms were done in the Habsburg monarchy, beginning at 1680, in order to liberate the peasants from the bondages of Feudalism. They were officially motivated by ideas related to the Age of Enlightenment - the "natural law", revealed to the monarch, which states that peasants should be free. Other motives were: to weaken the nobility, to gain support with the peasants, and to increase tax revenue (since the nobles were exempt from tax).

== Course ==
- In 1680, Leopold I, Holy Roman Emperor issued the first Robotpatent, which tried to limit the Robot (= corvee labor). More robotpatents, issued in 1717, 1738 and later, defended peasant property and economic activity from the landlords. But Leopold's decrees were not well enforced.
- In 1750, Maria Theresa commanded a royal commission to study the decline in tax receipts from Bohemia. They found out that landlords had seized lands from peasants. Since only the peasants paid taxes, the royal revenues decreased. As a response, she issued a series of ordinances to protect the peasants from oppressive obligations to the landlords. Fees paid by peasants to landlords were regulated from Vienna; rules preventing peasants from selling in the free market were repealed; the lord's authority over justice were diminished, and peasants were allowed to complain against the lords before imperial officers.
- In 1775-1777 Maria Theresa made agrarian reforms on Crown estates. She divided 25 estates to smallholdings and gave them to peasants. She later tried to extend these reforms to lands held by nobles, but they did not cooperate. She tried to negotiate with them, but progress was slow, until her death in 1780.
- In 1781, Maria's son Joseph II, Holy Roman Emperor, issued a much more radical patent to abolish serfdom. It removed all major restrictions of landlords on peasants and cancelled the Robot. In 1785, he launched a survey of productive lands, and in 1789, he ordered that all peasant dues to the lords be replaced with a small annual rent. But, the estate administrators didn't cooperate, and deliberately delayed the implementation of these laws. Joseph died in 1790 and his laws remained a dead letter.

== Outcomes ==
Land tenure in the Habsburg lands remained virtually unchanged until the Land reform in the Austrian empire. One reason for the failure of the reforms is that the monarchs tried to reform "from the top", without consulting the peasantry or trying to give them bargaining power against the nobles.
