= Land reform in Sparta =

Two land reforms were attempted at ancient Sparta in the 3rd century BC.

== Background ==
In the 7th century BC, Sparta conquered much land in wars with neighbouring states. This land, and many of the 500,000 inhabitants thereof, were divided among the 25,000 Spartiates.

By the 3rd century BC, However, Sparta had been greatly weakened by wars of over 300 years. Fewer than 700 families of the genuine Spartan stock (i.e. full citizenship) remained. In consequence of the innovation introduced by Epitadeus, who procured a repeal of the law which secured to every Spartan head of a family an equal portion of land, the landed property had passed into the hands of very few individuals, so that fewer than 100 Spartan families held estates, while the poor were greatly burdened with debt.

== Agis' reforms ==
In 244 BC, Sparta was faced by war with the Achaean League. Agis IV, a co-king of Sparta, tried to rehabilitate the military strength of Sparta by social reforms, including:

- General amnesty of debts;
- Redistribution of lands;
- Giving citizenship to a number of provincial inhabitants ("perioikoi") in order to make them eligible for army service;

=== Outcomes ===
The landowners, in cooperation with the other co-king Leonidas II, opposed to the reforms. After a lot of fighting, Agis was able to forgive the debts, but not to redistribute the lands.

His opponents exploited a period when he was absent from Sparta and, on his return he was subjected to a travesty of a trial. In 241 BC, Agis was betrayed by friends, who delivered him to his enemies, and murdered.

== Cleomenes' reforms ==
Cleomenes III was the son of Leonidas. His father forced him to marry Agiatis, the widow of his political rival Agis. He then fell in love with her, and she convinced him to resume the reforms of Agis.

In 227 BC, Cleomenes murdered five of the six Ephors (high magistrates) and resumed what Agis could not do – redistribution of land among all Spartiates capable of army service.

He first handed over all his own land to the state; he was soon followed by his stepfather and his friends and the rest of the citizens. He divided up all the land and gave an equal lot to every citizen. To increase the declining Spartan citizen body, he made some of the perioikoi into citizens.

There is a controversy about the motives of both Agis' and Cleomenes' reforms. Some historians, such as Plutarch, claim that they were moral patriots who cared for the poor. Modern historians claim that their only goal was to strengthen their army.

=== Outcomes ===
Cleomenes' reforms excited hostility amongst the wealthy of the Peloponnese who feared social revolution. For others, especially among the poor, Cleomenes inspired hope – a hope that was to be quickly dashed when Cleomenes started taking cities and it became obvious that social reform outside Sparta was the last thing on his mind.

Cleomenes was defeated by the Achaeans and fled to Egypt, where he eventually died. His reforms were lost with his death.

== See also ==
- History of Sparta#3rd century BC

== Sources ==
- Powelson, John (1987). The Story of Land - [A World History of Land Tenure and Agrarian Reform]. Cambridge, MA, USA: Lincoln Institute of Land Policy. pp. 28–29. ISBN 0899462189.
- Mason, Charles Peter (1867), "Agis (4)", in Smith, William (ed.), Dictionary of Greek and Roman Biography and Mythology, vol. 1, Boston: Little, Brown and Company, p. 73
