= Urbanization =

Process of population movement to cities

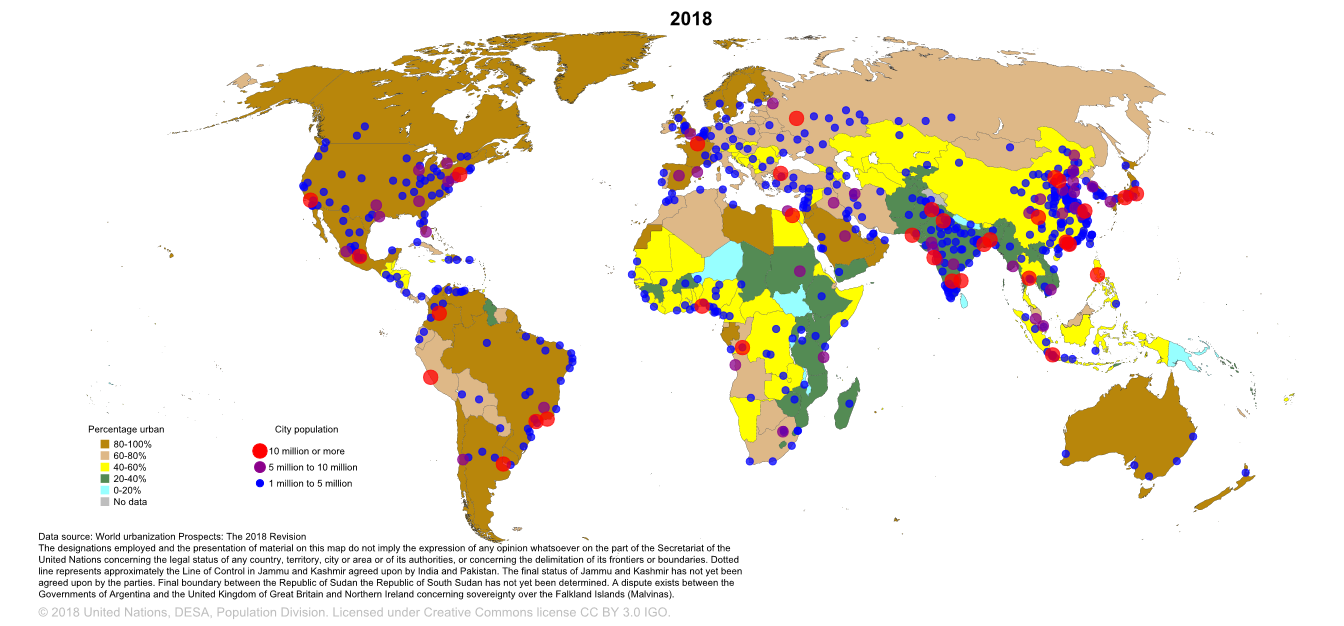
Global urbanization map showing the percentage of urbanization and the biggest global population centres per country in 2018, based on UN estimates.

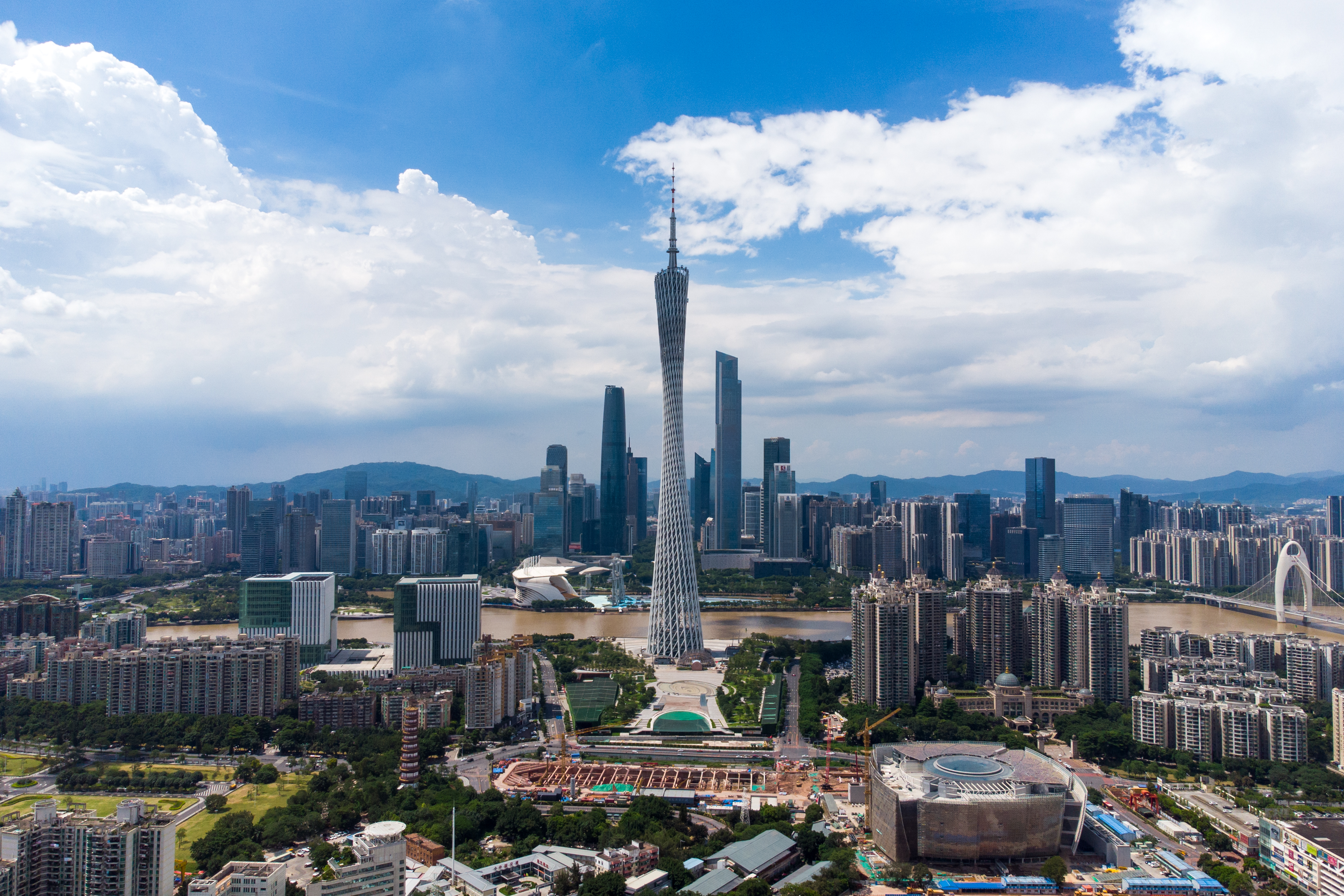
Guangzhou, a city of 14.5 million people, one of the eight adjacent metropolises located in the largest single agglomeration on Earth, ringing the Pearl River Delta of China

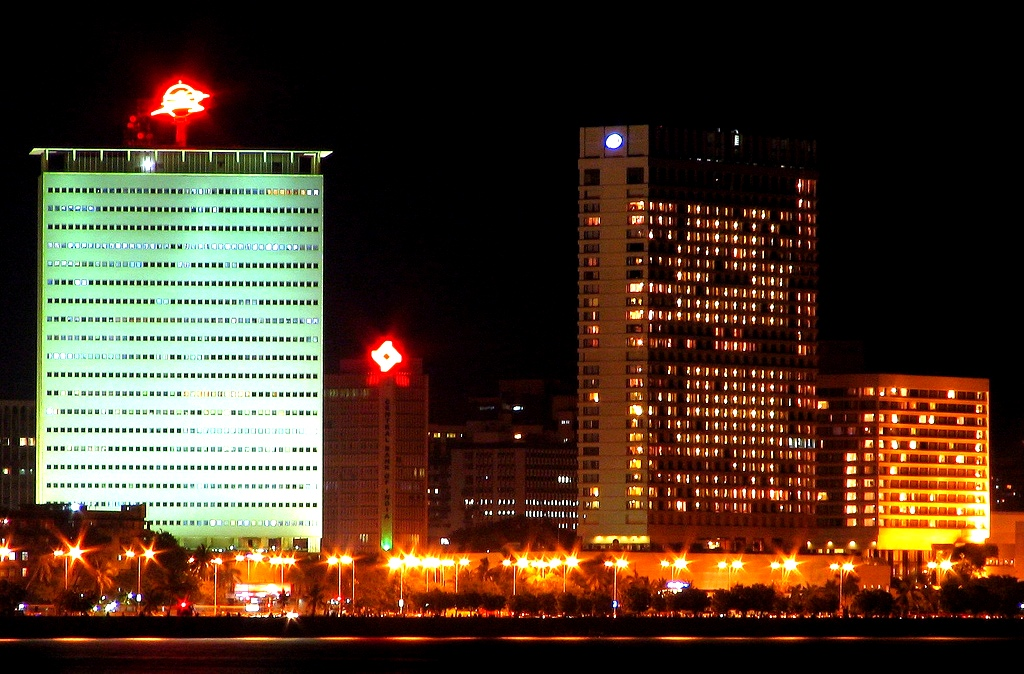
Mumbai, the most populous city in India and the eighth-most populous city in the world, with a total metropolitan area population of approximately 18.5 million and with the smallest area under the metropolitan of comparable cities in the world.

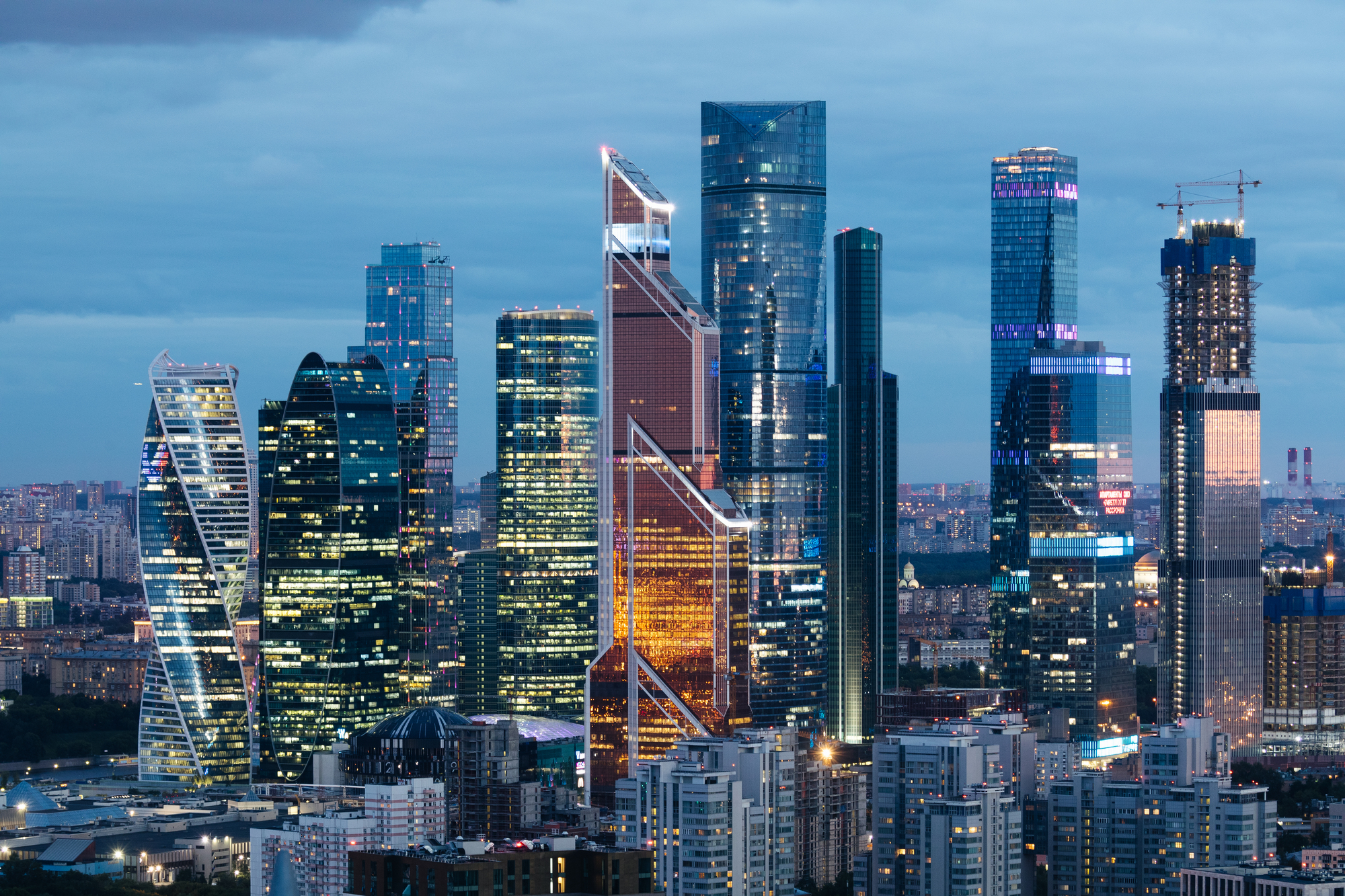
Moscow, the capital and largest city of Russia, and the largest metropolitan area in Europe; with over 20 million residents in its metropolitan area.

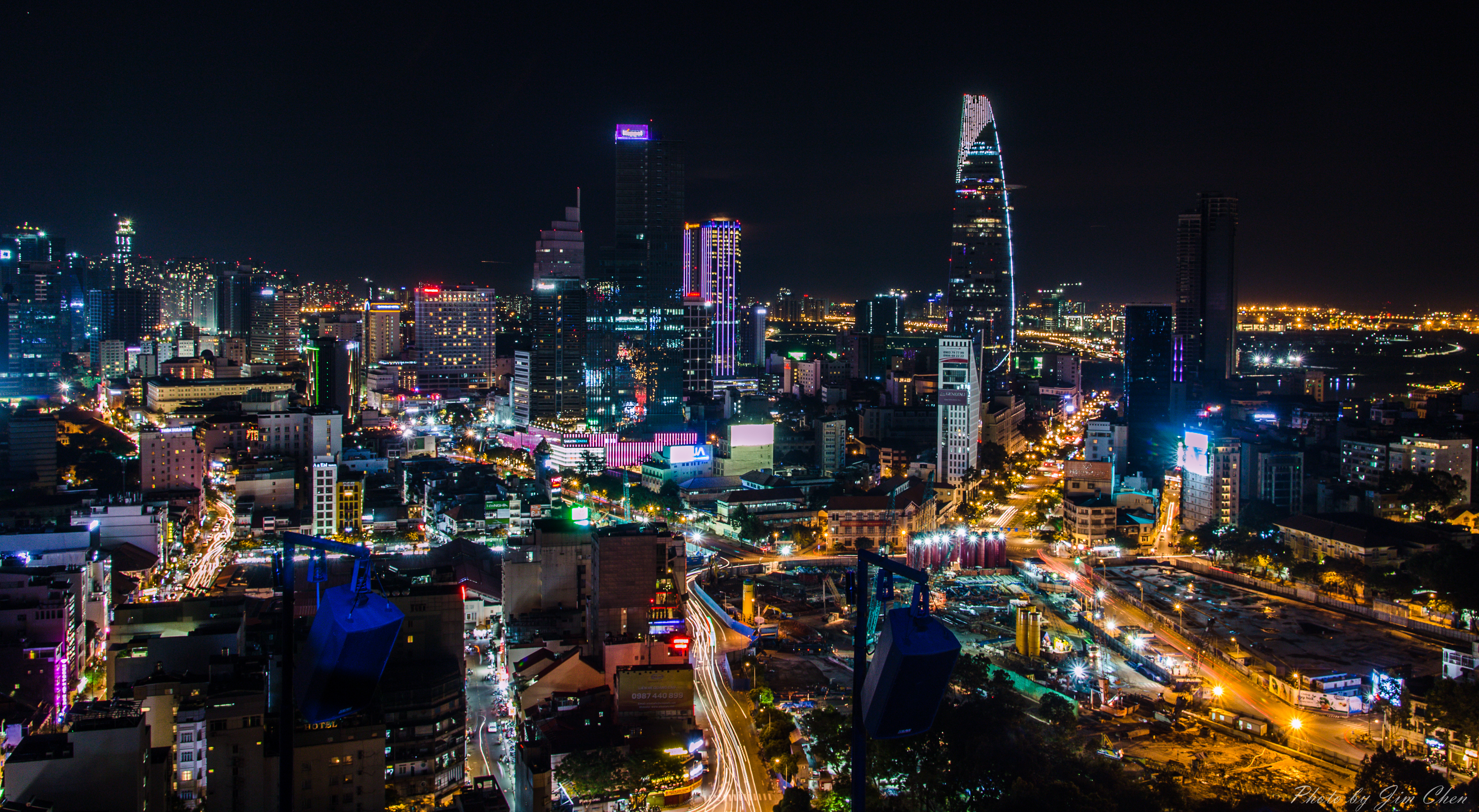
Ho Chi Minh City, the largest city in Vietnam with a population in the Ho Chi Minh metropolitan area of over 21.2 million people.

Urbanization (or urbanisation in British English) is the process by which human settlements are formed and become larger as more people live, recreate and work in cities and towns. It describes the population shift from rural to urban areas, the corresponding decrease in the proportion of people living in rural areas, and the ways in which societies and culture adapt to this change.

Rather than strictly referring to the absolute number of people living in urban environments, Urbanization refers to the proportion of the total national population living in areas classified as urban.“It is predicted that by 2050, about 77% of the developing world and 96% of the developed world will be urbanized.”. This is predicted to generate artificial scarcities of land, lack of drinking water, playgrounds and other essential resources for most urban dwellers. The predicted urban population growth is equivalent to approximately 3 billion urbanites by 2050, much of which will occur in Africa and Asia. Notably, the United Nations has also recently projected that nearly all global population growth from 2017 to 2030 will take place in cities, with about 1.1 billion new urbanites over the next 10 years. In the long term, urbanization is expected to significantly impact the quality of life in negative ways.

Urbanization is relevant to a range of disciplines, including urban planning, geography, sociology, architecture, economics, education, statistics, and public health. The phenomenon has been closely linked to globalization, modernization, industrialization, marketization, administrative/institutional power, and the sociological process of rationalization. Urbanization can be seen as a specific condition at a set time (e.g. the proportion of total population or area in cities or towns), or as an increase in that condition over time. Therefore, urbanization can be quantified either in terms of the level of urban development relative to the overall population, or as the rate at which the urban proportion of the population is increasing. Urbanization creates enormous social, economic and environmental challenges, which provide an opportunity for sustainability with the "potential to use resources much less or more efficiently, to create more sustainable land use and to protect the biodiversity of natural ecosystems." However, current urbanization trends have shown that massive urbanization has led to unsustainable ways of living. Developing urban resilience and urban sustainability in the face of increased urbanization is at the centre of international policy in Sustainable Development Goal 11 "Sustainable cities and communities."

Urbanization is not merely a modern phenomenon, but a rapid and historic transformation of human social roots on a global scale, whereby predominantly rural culture is being rapidly replaced by predominantly urban culture. The first major change in settlement patterns was the accumulation of hunter-gatherers into villages many thousands of years ago. Village culture is characterized by common bloodlines, intimate relationships, and communal behaviour, whereas urban culture is characterized by distant bloodlines, unfamiliar relations, and competitive behaviour. This unprecedented movement of people is forecast to continue and intensify during the next few decades, mushrooming cities to sizes unthinkable only a century ago. As a result, the world urban population growth curve has up till recently followed a quadratic-hyperbolic pattern.

== History ==
Urbanization over the past 500 years

A global map illustrating the first onset and spread of urban centres around the world, based on.

From the development of the earliest cities in Indus Valley Civilization, Mesopotamia and Egypt until the 18th century, an equilibrium existed between the vast majority of the population who were engaged in subsistence agriculture in a rural context, and small centres of populations in the towns where economic activity consisted only of trade at markets and manufactures on a small scale. Due to the primitive and relatively stagnant state of agriculture throughout this period, the ratio of rural to urban population remained at a fixed equilibrium. However, a significant increase in the percentage of the global urban population can be traced in the 1st millennium BCE.

With the onset of the British Agricultural Revolution and Industrial Revolution in the late 18th century, this relationship was finally broken and an unprecedented growth in urban population took place over the course of the 19th century, both through continued migration from the countryside and due to the tremendous demographic expansion that occurred at that time. In England and Wales, the proportion of the population living in cities with more than 20,000 people jumped from 17% in 1801 to 54% in 1891. Moreover, and adopting a broader definition of urbanization, while the urbanized population in England and Wales represented 72% of the total in 1891, for other countries the figure was 37% in France, 41% in Prussia and 28% in the United States.

As labourers were freed up from working the land due to higher agricultural productivity, they converged on the new industrial cities like Manchester and Birmingham, which were experiencing a boom in commerce, trade, and industry. Growing trade around the world also allowed cereals to be imported from North America and refrigerated meat from Australasia and South America. Spatially, cities also expanded due to the development of public transport systems, which facilitated commutes of longer distances to the city centre for the working class.

Urbanization rapidly spread across the Western world and, since the 1950s, it has begun to take hold in the developing world as well. At the turn of the 20th century, just 15% of the world's population lived in cities. According to the UN, the year 2007 witnessed the turning point when more than 50% of the world population was living in cities, for the first time in human history.

Yale University in June 2016 published urbanization data from the time period 3700 BC to 2000 AD, The data was used to make a video showing the development of cities around the world during the time period. The origins and spread of urban centres around the world were also mapped by archaeologists.

== Causes ==
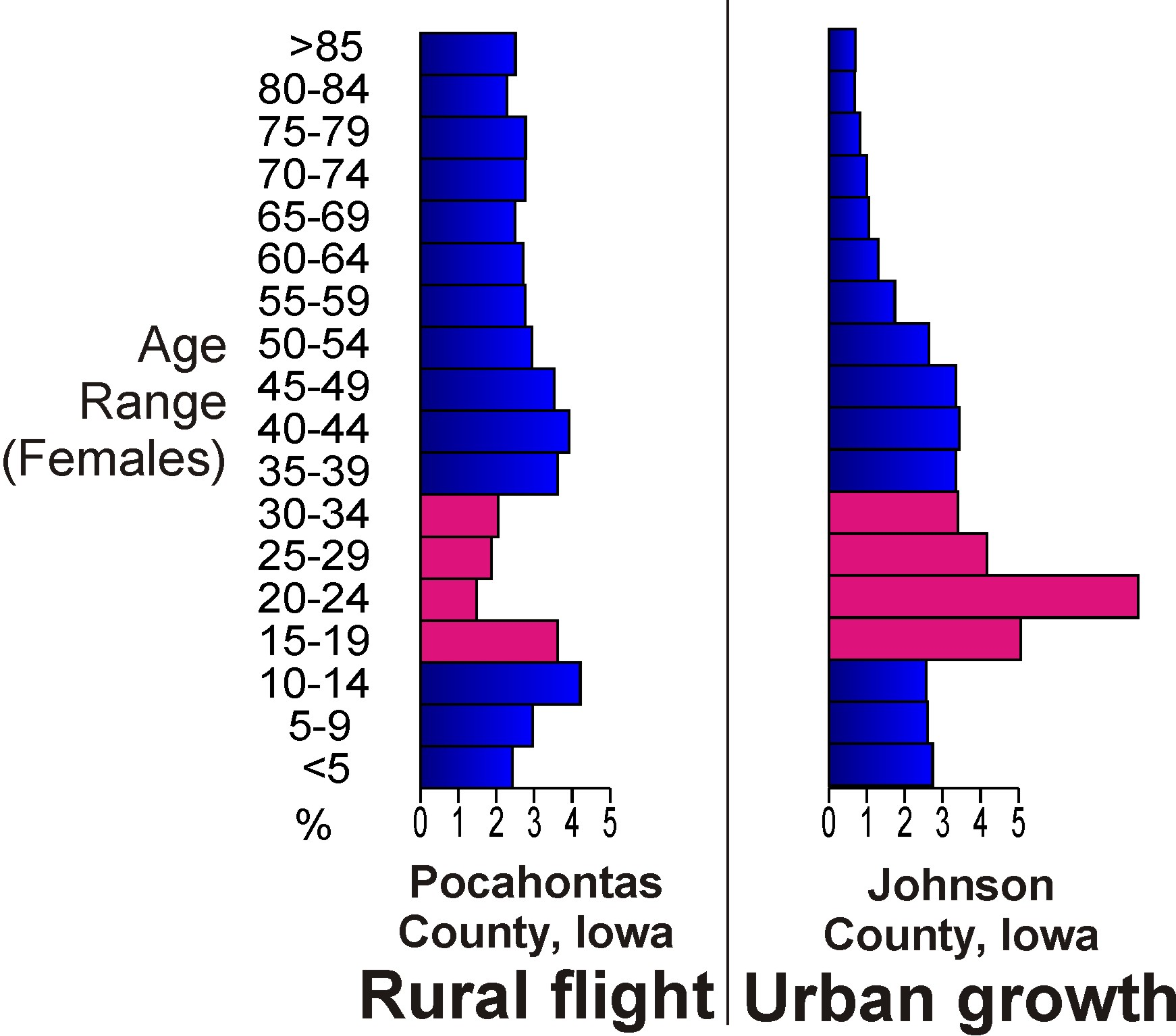
Population age comparison between rural Pocahontas County, Iowa and urban Johnson County, Iowa, illustrating the flight of young adults (red) to urban centres in Iowa.

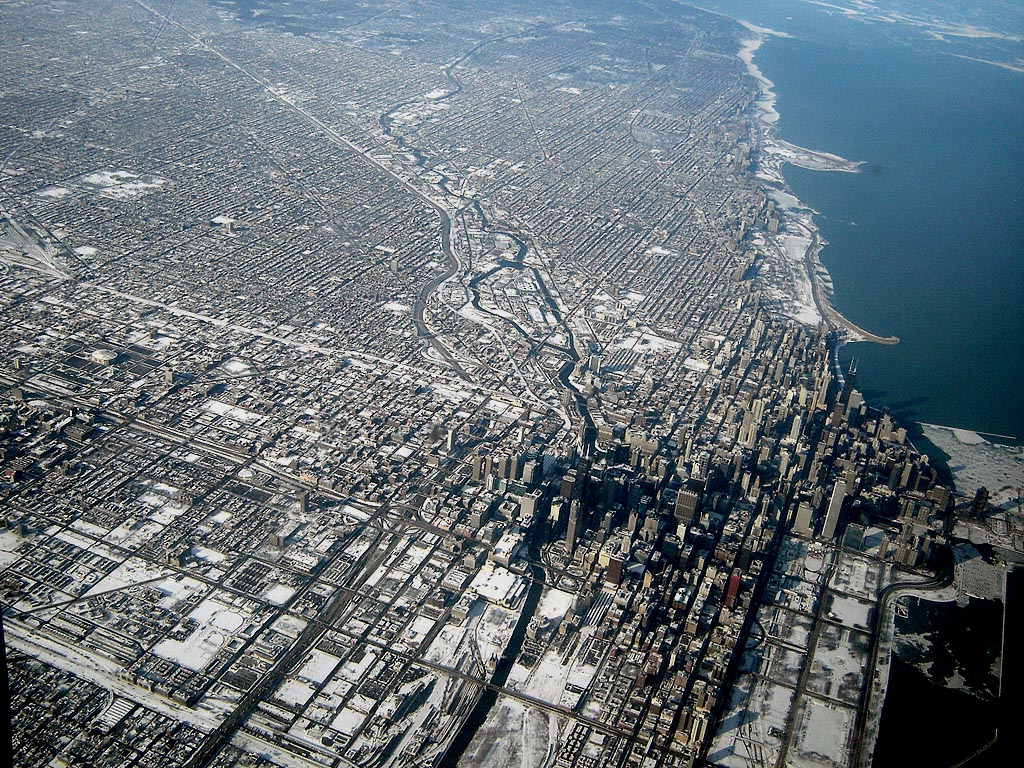
Chicago, Illinois, is an example of the early American grid system of development. The grid is enforced even on uneven topography.

Urbanization occurs either organically or planned as a result of individual, collective and state action. Living in a city can be culturally and economically beneficial since it can provide greater opportunities for access to the labour market, better education, housing, and safety conditions, and reduce the time and expense of commuting and transportation. Conditions like density, proximity, diversity, and marketplace competition are elements of an urban environment that are deemed beneficial. However, there are also harmful social phenomena that arise: alienation, stress, increased cost of living, and mass marginalization that are connected to an urban way of living. Suburbanization, which is happening in the cities of the largest developing countries, may be regarded as an attempt to balance these harmful aspects of urban life while still allowing access to a large extent of shared resources.

In cities, money, services, wealth and opportunities are centralized. Many rural inhabitants come to the city to seek their fortune and alter their social position. Businesses, which provide jobs and exchange capital, are more concentrated in urban areas. Whether the source is trade or tourism, it is also through the ports or banking systems, commonly located in cities, that foreign money flows into a country.

Many people move into cities for economic opportunities, but this does not fully explain the very high recent urbanization rates in places like China and India. Rural flight is a contributing factor to urbanization. In rural areas, often on small family farms or collective farms in villages, it has historically been difficult to access manufactured goods, though the relative overall quality of life is very subjective, and may certainly surpass that of the city. Farm living has always been susceptible to unpredictable environmental conditions, and in times of drought, flood or pestilence, survival may become extremely problematic.

Thai farmers are seen as poor, stupid, and unhealthy. As young people flee the farms, the values and knowledge of rice farming and the countryside are fading, including the tradition of long kek, helping neighbours plant, harvest, or build a house. We are losing what we call Thai-ness, the values of being kind, helping each other, having mercy and gratefulness.

— Iam Thongdee, Professor of Humanities, Mahidol University in Bangkok

In a New York Times article concerning the acute migration away from farming in Thailand, life as a farmer was described as "hot and exhausting". "Everyone says the farmer works the hardest but gets the least amount of money". In an effort to counter this impression, the Agriculture Department of Thailand is seeking to promote the impression that farming is "honorable and secure".

However, in Thailand, urbanization has also resulted in massive increases in problems such as obesity. Shifting from a rural environment to an urbanized community also caused a transition from a diet that was mainly carbohydrate-based to a diet higher in fat and sugar, consequently causing a rise in obesity. City life, especially in modern urban slums of the developing world, is not immune to pestilence or climatic disturbances such as floods, yet continues to strongly attract migrants. Examples of this were the 2011 Thailand floods and 2007 Jakarta flood. Urban areas are also far more prone to violence, drugs, and other urban social problems. In the United States, industrialization of agriculture has negatively affected the economy of small and middle-sized farms and strongly reduced the size of the rural labor market.

These are the costs of participating in the urban economy. Your increased income is canceled out by increased expenditure. In the end, you have even less left for food.

— Madhura Swaminathan, economist at Kolkata's Indian Statistical Institute

Particularly in the developing world, conflict over land rights due to the effects of globalization has led to less politically powerful groups, such as farmers, losing or forfeiting their land, resulting in obligatory migration into cities. In China, where land acquisition measures are forceful, there has been far more extensive and rapid urbanization (54%) than in India (36%), where peasants form militant groups (e.g. Naxalites) to oppose such efforts. Obligatory and unplanned migration often results in the rapid growth of slums. This is also similar to areas of violent conflict, where people are driven off their land due to violence.

Cities offer a larger variety of services, including specialist services not found in rural areas. These services require workers, resulting in more numerous and varied job opportunities. Elderly people may be forced to move to cities where there are doctors and hospitals that can cater to their health needs. Varied and high-quality educational opportunities are another factor in urban migration, as well as the opportunity to join, develop, and seek out social communities.

Urbanization also creates opportunities for women that are not available in rural areas. This creates a gender-related transformation where women are engaged in paid employment and have access to education. This may cause fertility to decline. However, women are sometimes still at a disadvantage due to their unequal position in the labour market, their inability to secure assets independently from male relatives and exposure to violence.

People in cities are more productive than in rural areas. An important question is whether this is due to agglomeration effects or whether cities simply attract those who are more productive. Urban geographers have shown that there exists a large productivity gain due to locating in dense agglomerations. It is thus possible that agents locate in cities in order to benefit from these agglomeration effects.

== Dominant conurbation ==
The dominant conurbation(s) of a country can get more benefits from the same things cities offer, attracting the rural population and urban and suburban populations from other cities. Dominant conurbations are quite often disproportionately large cities, but do not have to be. For instance Greater Manila is a conurbation instead of a city. Its total population of 20 million (over 20% national population) make it a primate city, but Quezon City (2.7 million), the largest municipality in Greater Manila, and Manila (1.6 million), the capital, are normal cities instead. A conurbation's dominance can be measured by output, wealth, and especially population, each expressed as a percentage of the entire country's. Greater Seoul is one conurbation that dominates South Korea. It is home to 50% of the entire national population.

Though Greater Busan-Ulsan (15%, 8 million) and Greater Osaka (14%, 18 million) dominate their respective countries, their populations are moving to their even more dominant rivals, Seoul and Tokyo respectively.

== Economic effects ==
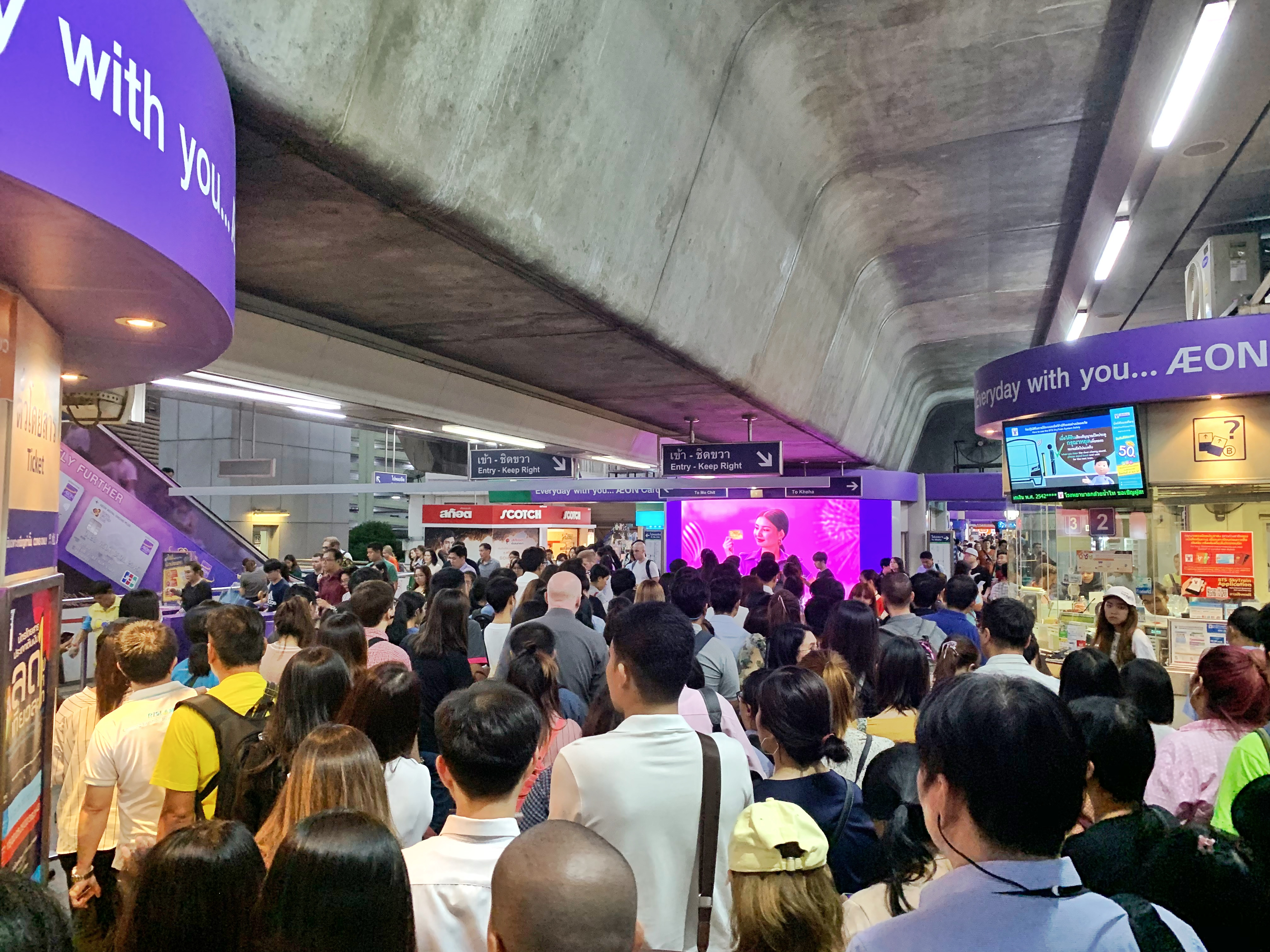
A crowded BTS Station during the rush hour in Bangkok, Thailand

Gross domestic product per capita and level of urbanization

As cities develop, costs will skyrocket. This often takes the working class out of the market, including officials and employees of the local districts. For example, Eric Hobsbawm's book The age of revolution: 1789–1848 (published 1962 and 2005) chapter 11, stated "Urban development in our period was a gigantic process of class segregation, which pushed the new labouring poor into great morasses of misery outside the centres of government, business, and the newly specialized residential areas of the bourgeoisie. The almost universal European division into a 'good' west end and a 'poor' east end of large cities developed in this period." This is probably caused by the south-west wind which carries coal smoke and other pollutants down, making the western edges of towns better than the eastern ones.

Similar problems now affect less developed countries, as rapid development of cities makes inequality worse. The drive to grow quickly and be efficient can lead to less fair urban development. Think tanks such as the Overseas Development Institute have proposed policies that encourage labour-intensive to make use of the migration of less skilled workers. One problem these migrant workers are involved with is the growth of slums. In many cases, the rural-urban unskilled migrant workers are attracted by economic opportunities in cities. Unfortunately, they cannot find a job and or pay for houses in urban areas and have to live in slums.

Urban problems, along with developments in their facilities, are also fuelling suburb development trends in less developed nations, though the trend for core cities in said nations tends to continue to become ever denser. Development of cities is often viewed negatively, but there are positives in cutting down on transport costs, creating new job opportunities, providing education and housing, and transportation. Living in cities permits individuals and families to make use of their closeness to workplaces and diversity. While cities have more varied markets and goods than rural areas, facility congestion, domination of one group, high overhead and rental costs, and the inconvenience of trips across them frequently combine to make marketplace competition harsher in cities than in rural areas.

In many developing countries where economies are growing, the growth is often random and based on a small number of industries. Youths in these nations lack access to financial services and business advisory services, cannot get credit to start a business, and have no entrepreneurial skills. Therefore, they cannot seize opportunities in these industries. Making sure adolescents have access to excellent schools and infrastructure to work in such industries and improve schools is compulsory to promote a fair society.

== Environmental effects ==
Globally, urban areas more than doubled in size between 1992 and 2015, growing from 33 million hectares (Mha) to 71 Mha in 2015. This expansion consumed 24 Mha of some of the most fertile croplands, 3.3 Mha of forestlands and 4.6 Mha of shrubland.

Furthermore, urbanization improves environmental eminence through superior facilities and standards in urban areas as compared to rural areas. Lastly, urbanization curbs pollution emissions by increasing innovations. In his 2009 book Whole Earth Discipline, Stewart Brand argues that the effects of urbanization are primarily positive for the environment. First, the birth rate of new urban dwellers falls immediately to replacement rate and keeps falling, reducing environmental stresses caused by population growth. Secondly, emigration from rural areas reduces destructive subsistence farming techniques, such as improperly implemented slash and burn agriculture. Alex Steffen also speaks of the environmental benefits of increasing the urbanization level in "Carbon Zero: Imagining Cities that can save the planet".

However, existing infrastructure and city planning practices are not sustainable. In July 2013 a report issued by the United Nations Department of Economic and Social Affairs warned that with 2.4 billion more people by 2050, the amount of food produced will have to increase by 70%, straining food resources, especially in countries already facing food insecurity due to changing environmental conditions. The mix of changing environmental conditions and the growing population of urban regions, according to UN experts, will strain basic sanitation systems and health care, and potentially cause a humanitarian and environmental disaster.

In April 2026, satellite data showed that Earth's night time brightness has increased significantly due to artificial lighting associated with urbanization and infrastructure expansion, highlighting the environmental impact of light pollution on natural night skies.

=== Urban heat island ===
Urban heat islands have become a growing concern over the years. An urban heat island is formed when industrial areas absorb and retain heat. Much of the solar energy reaching rural areas is used to evaporate water from plants and soil. In cities, there are less vegetation and exposed soil. Most of the sun's energy is instead absorbed by buildings and asphalt; leading to higher surface temperatures. Vehicles, factories, and heating and cooling units in factories and homes release even more heat. As a result, cities are often 1 to 3 °C (1.8 to 5.4 °F) warmer than other areas near them. Urban heat islands also make the soil drier and absorb less carbon dioxide from emissions. A Qatar University study found that land-surface temperatures in Doha increased annually by 0.65 °C from 2002 to 2013 and 2023.

=== Water quality ===
Urban runoff, polluted water created by rainfall on impervious surfaces, is a common effect of urbanization. Precipitation from rooftops, roads, parking lots and sidewalks flows to storm drains, instead of percolating into groundwater. The contaminated stormwater in the drains is typically untreated and flows to nearby streams, rivers or coastal bays.

Eutrophication in water bodies is another effect large populations in cities have on the environment. When rain occurs in these large cities, it filters CO_{2} and other pollutants in the air onto the ground. These chemicals are washed directly into rivers, streams, and oceans, making water worse and damaging ecosystems in them.

Eutrophication is a process which causes low levels of oxygen in water and algal blooms that may harm aquatic life. Harmful algal blooms make dangerous toxins. They live best in nitrogen- and phosphorus-rich places which include the oceans contaminated by the aforementioned chemicals. In these ideal conditions, they choke surface water, blocking sunlight and nutrients from other life forms. Overgrowth of algal blooms makes water worse overall and disrupts the natural balance of aquatic ecosystems. Furthermore, as algal blooms die, CO_{2} is produced. This makes the ocean more acidic, a process called acidification.

The ocean's surface can absorb CO_{2} from the Earth's atmosphere as emissions increase with the rise in urban development. In fact, the ocean absorbs a quarter of the CO_{2} produced by humans. This helps to lessen the harmful effects of greenhouse gases, but it also makes the ocean more acidic. A drop in pH the prevents the proper formation of calcium carbonate, which sea creatures need to build or keep shells or skeletons. This is especially true for many species of molluscs and coral. However, some species have been able to thrive in a more acidic environment.

=== Food waste ===
Rapid growth of communities creates new challenges in the developed world and one such challenge is an increase in food waste also known as urban food waste. Food waste is the disposal of food products that can no longer be used due to unused products, expiration, or spoilage. The increase of food waste can raise environmental concerns such as increase production of methane gases and attraction of disease vectors. Landfills are the third leading cause of the release of methane, causing a concern on its impact to our ozone and on the health of individuals. Accumulation of food waste causes increased fermentation, which increases the risk of rodent and bug migration. An increase in migration of disease vectors creates greater potential of disease spreading to humans.

Waste management systems vary on all scales from global to local and can also be influenced by lifestyle. Waste management was not a primary concern until after the Industrial Revolution. As urban areas continued to grow along with the human population, proper management of solid waste became an apparent concern. To address these concerns, local governments sought solutions with the lowest economic impacts which meant implementing technical solutions at the very last stage of the process. Current waste management reflects these economically motivated solutions, such as incineration or unregulated landfills. Yet, a growing increase for addressing other areas of life cycle consumption has occurred from initial stage reduction to heat recovery and recycling of materials. For example, concerns for mass consumption and fast fashion have moved to the forefront of the urban consumers' priorities. Aside from environmental concerns (e.g. climate change effects), other urban concerns for waste management are public health and land access.

=== Habitat fragmentation ===
Urbanization can have a large effect on biodiversity by causing a division of habitats and thereby alienation of species, a process known as habitat fragmentation. Habitat fragmentation does not destroy the habitat, as seen in habitat loss, but rather breaks it apart with things like roads and railways. This change may affect a species ability to sustain life by separating it from the environment in which it is able to easily access food, and find areas that they may hide from predation. With proper planning and management, fragmentation can be avoided by adding corridors that aid in the connection of areas and allow for easier movement around urbanized regions.

Depending on the various factors, such as level of urbanization, both increases or decreases in "species richness" can be seen. This means that urbanization may be detrimental to one species but also help facilitate the growth of others. In instances of housing and building development, many times vegetation is completely removed immediately in order to make it easier and less expensive for construction to occur, thereby obliterating any native species in that area. Habitat fragmentation can filter species with limited dispersal capacity. For example, aquatic insects are found to have lower species richness in urban landscapes. The more urbanized the surrounding of habitat is, the fewer species can reach the habitat. The negative effects of urbanisation on aquatic insects can be long-lasting from the temporal perspective. Other times, such as with birds, urbanization may allow for an increase in richness when organisms are able to adapt to the new environment. This can be seen in species that may find food while scavenging developed areas or vegetation that has been added after urbanization has occurred i.e. planted trees in city areas.

== Health and social effects ==
When cities don't plan for increases in population it drives up house and land prices, creating rich (ghettos) and poor ghettos. "You get a very unequal society and that inequality is manifested where people live, in our neighbourhoods, and it means there can be less capacity for empathy and less development for all society."

— Jack Finegan, Urban Programme Specialist at UN-Habitat

In the developing world, urbanization does not translate into a significant increase in life expectancy. Rapid urbanization has led to increased mortality from non-communicable diseases associated with lifestyle, including cancer and heart disease. Differences in mortality from contagious diseases vary depending on the particular disease and location.

Urban health levels are on average better in comparison to rural areas. However, residents in poor urban areas such as slums and informal settlements suffer "disproportionately from disease, injury, premature death, and the combination of ill-health and poverty entrenches disadvantage over time." Many of the urban poor have difficulty accessing health services due to their inability to pay for them; so they resort to less qualified and unregulated providers.

While urbanization is associated with improvements in public hygiene, sanitation and access to health care, it also entails changes in occupational, dietary, and exercise patterns. It can have mixed effects on health patterns, alleviating some problems, and accentuating others.

=== Nutrition ===
Traditionally, rural populations have tended to eat plant-based diets rich in grains, fruits and vegetables, and with low fat content. However, rural people migrating to urban areas often shift towards diets that rely more on processed foods characterized by a higher content of meat, sugars, refined grains and fats. Urban residents typically have reduced time available for at-home food preparation combined with increased disposable income, facilitating access to convenience foods and ready-to-eat meals.

One such effect is the formation of food deserts. Nearly 23.5 million people in the United States lack access to supermarkets within one mile of their home. Several studies suggest that long distances to a grocery store are associated with higher rates of obesity and other health disparities.

Food deserts in developed countries often correspond to areas with a high density of fast food chains and convenience stores that offer little to no fresh food. Urbanization has been shown to be associated with the consumption of less fresh fruits, vegetables, and whole grains and a higher consumption of processed foods and sugar-sweetened beverages. Poor access to healthy food and high intakes of fat, sugar and salt are associated with a greater risk for obesity, diabetes and related chronic disease. Overall, body mass index and cholesterol levels increase sharply with national income and the degree of urbanization.[40]

Food deserts in the United States are most commonly found in low-income and predominately African American neighbourhoods. One study on food deserts in Denver, Colorado found that, in addition to minorities, the affected neighbourhoods also had a high proportion of children and new births. In children, urbanization is associated with a lower risk of under-nutrition but a higher risk of being overweight.

=== Infections ===
Urbanization has also been linked to the spread of communicable diseases, which can spread more rapidly in the favourable environment with more people living in a smaller area. Such diseases can be respiratory infections and gastrointestinal infections. Other infections could be infections, which need a vector to spread to humans. An example of this could be dengue fever.

=== Asthma ===
Urbanization has also been associated with an increased risk of asthma as well. Throughout the world, as communities transition from rural to more urban societies, the number of people affected by asthma increases. The odds of reduced rates of hospitalization and death from asthmas has decreased for children and young adults in urbanized municipalities in Brazil. This finding indicates that urbanization may have a negative impact on population health particularly affecting people's susceptibility to asthma.

In low and middle income countries many factors contribute to the high numbers of people with asthma. Similar to areas in the United States with increasing urbanization, people living in growing cities in low income countries experience high exposure to air pollution, which increases the prevalence and severity of asthma among these populations. Links have been found between exposure to traffic-related air pollution and allergic diseases. Children living in poor, urban areas in the United States now have an increased risk of morbidity due to asthma in comparison to other low-income children in the United States. In addition, children with croup living in urban areas have higher hazard ratios for asthma than similar children living in rural areas. Researchers suggest that this difference in hazard ratios is due to the higher levels of air pollution and exposure to environmental allergens found in urban areas.

Exposure to elevated levels of ambient air pollutants such as nitrogen dioxide (NO_{2}), carbon monoxide (CO), and particulate matter with a diameter of less than 2.5 micrometres (PM_{2.5}), can cause DNA methylation of CpG sites in immune cells, which increases children's risk of developing asthma. Studies have shown a positive correlation between Foxp3 methylation and children's exposure to NO_{2}, CO, and PM_{2.5}. Furthermore, any amount of exposure to high levels of air pollution have shown long term effects on the Foxp3 region.

Despite the increase in access to health services that usually accompanies urbanization, the rise in population density negatively affects air quality ultimately mitigating the positive value of health resources as more children and young adults develop asthma due to high pollution rates. However, urban planning, as well as emission control, can lessen the effects of traffic-related air pollution on allergic diseases such as asthma.

=== Crime ===
Historically, crime and urbanization have gone hand in hand. The simplest explanation is that areas with a higher population density are surrounded by greater availability of goods. Committing crimes in urbanized areas is also more feasible. Modernization has led to more crime as well, as the modern media has raised greater awareness of the income gap between the rich and the poor. This leads to feelings of deprivation, which in turn can lead to crime. In some regions where urbanization happens in wealthier areas, a rise in property crime and a decrease in violent crime is seen.

Data shows that there is an increase in crime in urbanized areas. Some factors include per capita income, income inequality, and overall population size. There is also a smaller association between unemployment rate, police expenditures and crime. Research indicates that inter‑city commuting contributes to urban crime rates, so cities that attract many non‑resident workers often exhibit elevated levels of theft and burglary independent of population size.

The presence of crime also has the ability to produce more crime. These areas have less social cohesion and therefore less social control. This is evident in the geographical regions that crime occurs in. As most crime tends to cluster in city centres, the further the distance from the centre of the city, the lower the occurrence of crimes are.

Migration is also a factor that can increase crime in urbanized areas. People from one area are displaced and forced to move into an urbanized society. Here they are in a new environment with new norms and social values. This can lead to less social cohesion and more crime.

=== Physical activity ===
Although urbanization tends to produce more negative effects, one positive effect that urbanization has impacted is an increase in physical activity in comparison to rural areas. Residents of rural areas and communities in the United States have higher rates of obesity and engage in less physical activity than urban residents. Rural residents consume a higher percent of fat calories and are less likely to meet the guidelines for physical activity and more likely to be physically inactive. In comparison to regions within the United States, the west has the lowest prevalence of physical inactivity and the south has the highest prevalence of physical inactivity. Metropolitan and large urban areas across all regions have the highest prevalence of physical activity among residents.

Barriers such as geographic isolation, busy and unsafe roads, and social stigmas lead to decreased physical activity in rural environments. Faster speed limits on rural roads prohibits the ability to have bike lanes, sidewalks, footpaths, and shoulders along the side of the roads. Less developed open spaces in rural areas, like parks and trails, suggest that there is lower walkability in these areas in comparison to urban areas. Many residents in rural settings have to travel long distances to utilize exercise facilities, taking up too much time in the day and deterring residents from using recreational facilities to obtain physical activity. Additionally, residents of rural communities are traveling further for work, decreasing the amount of time that can be spent on leisure physical activity and significantly decreases the opportunity to partake in active transportation to work.

Neighbourhoods and communities with nearby fitness venues, a common feature of urbanization, have residents that partake in increased amounts of physical activity. Communities with sidewalks, street lights, and traffic signals have residents participating in more physical activity than communities without those features. Having a variety of destinations close to where people live, increases the use of active transportation, such as walking and biking. Active transportation is also enhanced in urban communities where there is easy access to public transportation due to residents walking or biking to transportation stops.

In a study comparing different regions in the United States, opinions across all areas were shared that environmental characteristics like access to sidewalks, safe roads, recreational facilities, and enjoyable scenery are positively associated with participation in leisure physical activity. Perceiving that resources are nearby for physical activity increases the likelihood that residents of all communities will meet the guidelines and recommendations for appropriate physical activity. Specific to rural residents, the safety of outdoor developed spaces and convenient availability to recreational facilities matters most when making decisions on increasing physical activity. In order to combat the levels of inactivity in rural residents, more convenient recreational features, such as the ones discussed in this paragraph, need to be implemented into rural communities and societies.

=== Mental health ===
Urbanization factors that contribute to mental health can be thought of as factors that affect the individual and factors that affect the larger social group. At the macro, social group level, changes related to urbanization are thought to contribute to social disintegration and disorganization. These macro factors contribute to social disparities which affect individuals by creating perceived insecurity. Perceived insecurity can be due problems with the physical environment, such as issues with personal safety, or problems with the social environment, such as a loss of positive self-concepts from negative events. Increased stress is a common individual psychological stressor that accompanies urbanization and is thought to be due to perceived insecurity. Changes in social organization, a consequence of urbanization, are thought to lead to reduced social support, increased violence, and overcrowding. It is these factors that are thought to contribute to increased stress.

A 2004 study of 4.4 million Swedish residents found that people who live in cities have a 20% increased chance of developing depression.

=== Social and cultural effects ===
Social scientists have argued that urbanization influences people's psychology, such as their values, attitudes, and relationships. One line of thinking is that cities tend to have more open, individualistic cultures. For example, US cities tend to have looser, more permissive social norms than rural areas. A study in Japan found that people from rural areas were more likely to take into account how their choice would affect other people.

However, some patterns seem to contradict this theory. For instance, when researchers tested social norms across China, people in urban areas reported tighter social norms. In another study, researchers tested the cultural thought style of youth as they moved to college across China. Youngsters who moved from rural areas of China to big cities like Beijing and Shanghai did not show consistent changes in their thought style. Instead, the rice-farming or wheat-farming history of the regions was a stronger predictor of their thought style change, which suggests that cultural histories are living on in modern cities. One possibility is that effects of urbanization on people's psychology differ across cultures.

== Changing forms ==
Patterns of urbanization

Different forms of urbanization can be classified depending on the style of architecture and planning methods as well as the historic growth of areas.

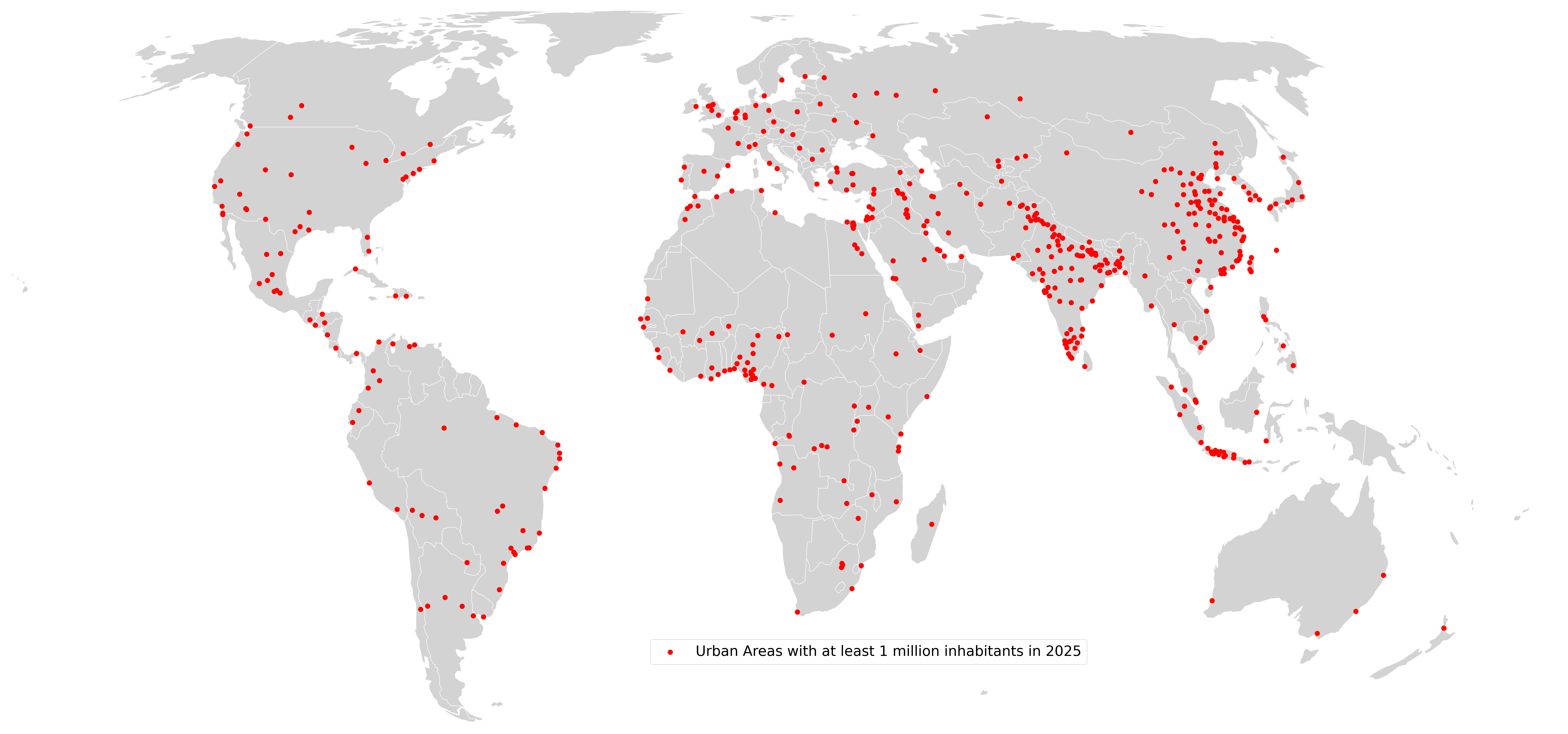
Map showing urban areas with at least one million inhabitants in 2025.

In cities of the developed world urbanization traditionally exhibited a concentration of human activities and settlements around the downtown area, the so-called in-migration. In-migration refers to migration from former colonies and similar places. The fact that many immigrants settle in impoverished city centres led to the notion of the "peripheralization of the core", which simply describes that people who used to be at the periphery of the former empires now live right in the centre.

Recent developments, such as inner-city redevelopment schemes, mean that new arrivals in cities no longer necessarily settle in the centre. In some developed regions, the reverse effect, originally called counter urbanization has occurred, with cities losing population to rural areas, and is particularly common for richer families. This has been possible because of improved communications and has been caused by factors such as the fear of crime and poor urban environments. It has contributed to the phenomenon of shrinking cities experienced by some parts of the industrialized world.

Rural migrants are attracted by the possibilities that cities can offer, but often settle in shanty towns and experience extreme poverty. The inability of countries to provide adequate housing for these rural migrants is related to overurbanization, a phenomenon in which the rate of urbanization grows more rapidly than the rate of economic development, leading to high unemployment and high demand for resources. In the 1980s, this was attempted to be tackled with the urban bias theory which was promoted by Michael Lipton.

Most of the urban poor in developing countries unable to find work can spend their lives in insecure, poorly paid jobs. According to research by the Overseas Development Institute pro-poor urbanization will require labour-intensive growth, supported by labour protection, flexible land use regulation and investments in basic services.'

=== Suburbanization ===
When the residential area shifts outward, this is called suburbanization. A number of researchers and writers suggest that suburbanization has gone so far to form new points of concentration outside the downtown both in developed and developing countries such as India. This networked, poly-centric form of concentration is considered by some emerging pattern of urbanization. It is called variously edge city (Garreau, 1991), network city (Batten, 1995), postmodern city (Dear, 2000), or exurb, though the latter term now refers to a less dense area beyond the suburbs. Los Angeles is the best-known example of this type of urbanization. In the United States, this process has reversed as of 2011, with "re-urbanization" occurring as suburban flight due to chronically high transport costs.

...the most important class conflict in the poor countries of the world today is not between labour and capital. Nor is it between foreign and national interests. It is between rural classes and urban classes. The rural sector contains most of the poverty and most of the low-cost sources of potential advance; but the urban sector contains most of the articulateness, organization, and power. So the urban classes have been able to win most of the rounds of the struggle with the countryside...

— Michael Lipton, author of urban bias theory

=== Planned urbanization ===
Urbanization can be planned urbanization or organic. Planned urbanization, i.e.: planned community or the garden city movement, is based on an advance plan, which can be prepared for military, aesthetic, economic or urban design reasons. Examples can be seen in many ancient cities; although with exploration came the collision of nations, which meant that many invaded cities took on the desired planned characteristics of their occupiers. Many ancient organic cities experienced redevelopment for military and economic purposes, new roads carved through the cities, and new parcels of land were cordoned off serving various planned purposes giving cities distinctive geometric designs. UN agencies prefer to see urban infrastructure installed before urbanization occurs. Landscape planners are responsible for landscape infrastructure (public parks, sustainable urban drainage systems, greenways etc.) which can be planned before urbanization takes place, or afterwards to revitalize an area and create greater livability within a region. Concepts of control of the urban expansion are considered in the American Institute of Planners.

As population continues to grow and urbanize at unprecedented rates, new urbanism and smart growth techniques are implemented to create a transition into developing environmentally, economically, and socially sustainable cities. Additionally, a more well-rounded approach articulates the importance to promote participation of non-state actors, which could include businesses, research and non-profit organizations and, most importantly, local citizens. Smart Growth and New Urbanism's principles include walkability, mixed-use development, comfortable high-density design, land conservation, social equity, and economic diversity. Mixed-use communities work to fight gentrification with affordable housing to promote social equity, decrease automobile dependency to lower use of fossil fuels, and promote a localized economy. Walkable communities have a 38% higher average GDP per capita than less walkable urban metros (Leinberger, Lynch). By combining economic, environmental, and social sustainability, cities will become equitable, resilient, and more appealing than urban sprawl that overuses land, promotes automobile use, and segregates the population economically.

=== Water scarcity ===
Water stress is increasingly affecting urbanization. Water stress arises through slum development, anarchic construction, water scarcity, the absence of financial structures, the absence of basic structures, the absence of infrastructure such as roads, bridges, sidewalks, signs, markets, schools, etc., can sometimes hinder the productivity of certain cities. Unfortunately, this phenomenon affects even the largest cities in the world; in 2018, 300,000 were recorded in the world, housing around 40% of the world's urban population.

== Urbanization throughout the world ==
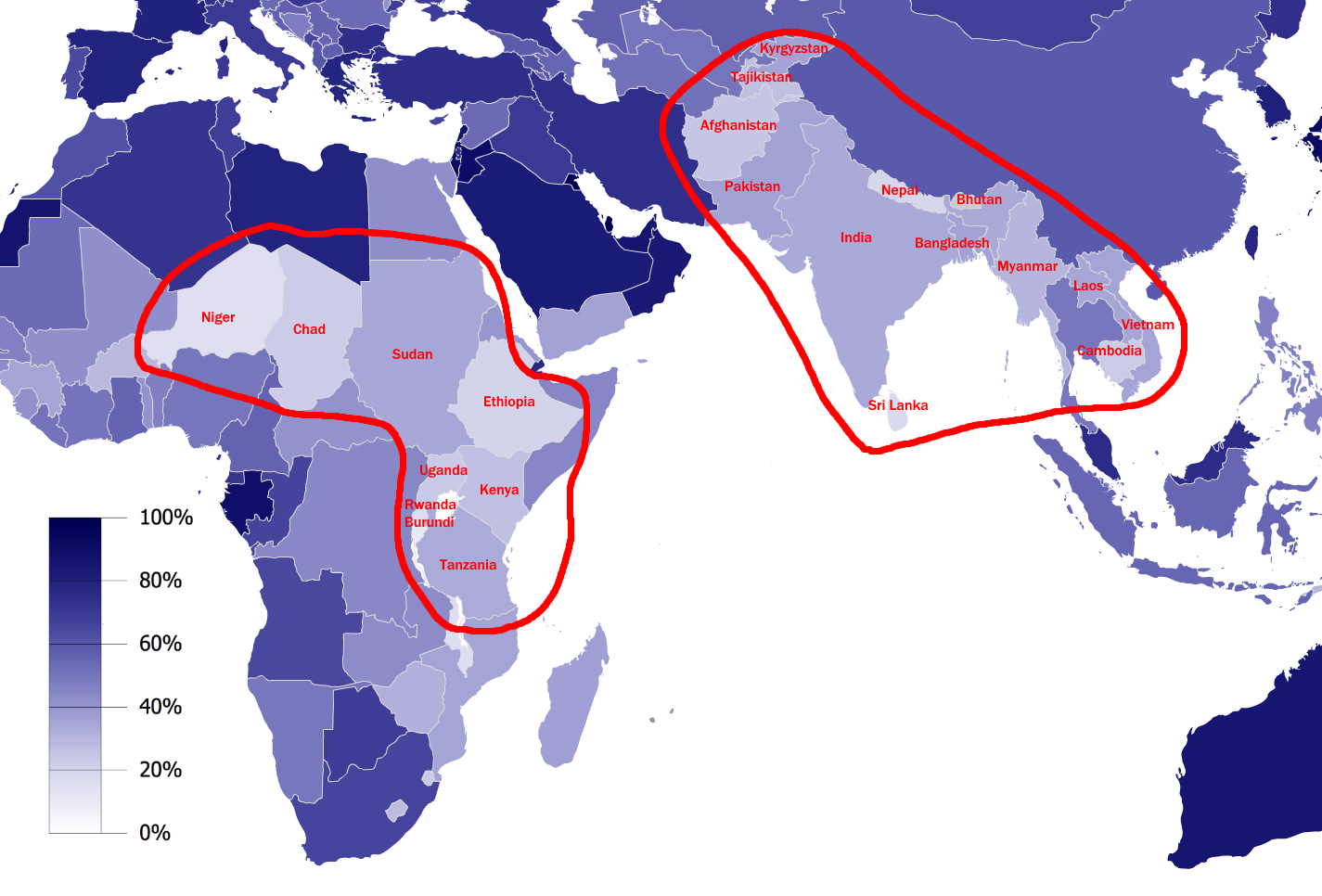
Map with circled African and Asian belts of non-urbanized countries

Presently, most countries in the world are urbanized, with the global urbanization average numbering 56.2% in 2020. However, there are great differences between some regions; the nations of Europe, the Middle East, the Americas and East Asia are predominantly urbanized. Meanwhile, two large belts (from central to eastern Africa, and from central to southeast Asia) of very lowly urbanized countries exist, as seen on the map here. These labeled countries are among the least urbanized.

As of 2022, urbanization rates are over 80% in the United States, Canada, Mexico, Brazil, Argentina, Chile, Japan, Australia, the United Kingdom, France, Finland, Denmark, Israel, Spain and South Korea. South America is the most urbanized continent in the world, accounting for more than 80% of its total population living in urban areas. It is also the only continent where the urbanization rate is over 80%.

== See also ==
- Back to the land
- City-state
- Counterurbanization
- Division of labour
- Exurb
- Ghetto
- Human population planning
- Human migration
- Megalopolis (city type)
- Political demography
- Pseudo-urbanization
- Push and pull factors in migration
- Synurbization
- Urban ecology
- Urban exploration
- Urban history
- Urban metabolism
- Urban morphology
- Urban studies
- Urbanization by country
- White flight

=== Historical ===
- Neolithic Revolution
- Oppidum
- Polis
- Urban revolution

=== Regional ===
- Urbanization in Africa
- Urbanization in China
- Urbanization in India
- Urbanization in Pakistan
- Urbanization in the United States

== Sources ==
- This article incorporates text from a free content work. Licensed under CC BY 4.0 (license statement/permission). Text taken from The State of the World’s Land and Water Resources for Food and Agriculture 2025, Food and Agriculture Organization of the United Nations (FAO).

== Sources ==
- This article incorporates text from a free content work. Licensed under CC BY 4.0 (license statement/permission). Text taken from The State of World Fisheries and Aquaculture 2024, FAO.
