= Instaprint =

Photographic technology company

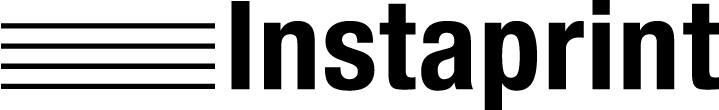
- Current Instaprint logo, which was designed in 2011
- Founder: Andrew Zolty; Mattias Gunneras; Michael Lipton
- Headquarters: Brooklyn, New York, United States
- Area served: Worldwide
- Website: www.instaprint.me

Instaprint is a technology company based in Brooklyn, New York. Its main concentration is on web-connected, photography-based products, including technologies for hashtag printing and geotag printing, and wall-mounted printers.

Instaprint's wall-mounted hashtag printers print Instagram photos in real time by using a specific hashtag at an event. Brands or companies rent the hashtag printers for large corporate or high-profile events. When the events’ guests use a branded hashtag at the event, the guests’ Instagram pictures are printed from the box, and the guests can keep them as a souvenir.

Instaprint products have been featured at over 1,000 events in 150 cities around the world. The printers have been rented for well-known events such as the Super Bowl, Olympics, the Grammys, NHL Winter Classic, Lollapalooza, US Open, AUS Open, Art Basel, NYSE, Festival de Canne, Comic-Con, SxSW, CES and New York Fashion Week.

== History ==
In February, 2011, Instagram released a private beta of their API about a month after introducing hashtags on Instagram. Shortly thereafter, Instaprint founders, Andrew Zolty, Mattias Gunneras and Michael Lipton came up with the idea of turning Instagram photos into Polaroids (Polaroid had inspired the Instagram platform). Zolty, Gunneras and Lipton were all working at Breakfast, a company they had also founded that made digital products that produced real world experiences.

With little to no funds, the team tried to get their Instaprint idea sponsored at SxSW Interactive. Two of the companies they reached out to were Instagram and Polaroid, but they did not end up sponsoring the product.

With no sponsors, they decided to build the printers anyway to see if they could get PR at SxSW.

Initially, they built three printers, testing the first in March 2011. Their first printers used a Zink printer engine, which meant they were “ink-free,” instead pulling color from the paper itself. Polaroid also uses Zink printer engines for its products.

The first appearance of the Instaprint hashtag printers was on a live site launched on March 7, 2011. The site featured a live stream of two of the printers hung up in the office window of Breakfast. Any print hashtagged #instaprint would be printed live on the site.

The week after the live site was launched, the Instaprint team brought the hashtag printers to SXSW. The hashtag printers generated a lot of excitement, and they were invited to multiple popular events at the festival. Felicia Day invited them over Twitter to the Driskell hotel. Here, the team set up the printers and met several celebrities excited by the product, including Instagram co-founder, Mike Kruger, who came out specifically to see the hashtag printers.

== Extensions ==
Instaprint later developed more hashtag enabled products, the largest scale example being Instaprint Mosaics. Also featured at events, Mosaics are created by guests using a branded hashtag, and the Instagram photos are run through a complex algorithm, printed out and assigned to a specific place in a grid. When all the photos are printed and placed in the grid, they create a large-scale image, usually featuring the brand throwing the event. Mosaics launched with Ray-Ban at the Primavera Sound Festival in Barcelona on May 29, 2012. Mosaics are patent-pending.

== Kickstarter ==
In 2012, Instaprint put the product on the crowdfunding website Kickstarter. It did not raise enough funds.
