= Overurbanization =

Overurbanization is a thesis originally developed by scholars of demography, geography, ecology, economics, political science, and sociology in the emergence of International Nongovernmental Organizations Amid Declining States. The term is intentionally comparative and has been used to differentiate between developed and developing countries. Several causes have been suggested, but the most common is rural-push and urban-pull factors in addition to population growth.

== Definition ==
The concept of overurbanization first emerged in the mid-20th century to describe cities whose rate of industrialization was growing more slowly than their rate of urbanization. According to sociologist Josef Gugler, the concept was "widely accepted in the 1950s and into the 1960s" and was split into two approaches, a diachronic and a synchronic approach. The synchronic approach, the main one taken in the 1950s, was proposed by sociologists Kingsley Davis and Hilda Golden who defined whether a country was overurbanized based on how its relationship between industrialization and urbanization compared to that of other countries during the same time period. Specifically, countries considered part of the Third World were compared to countries deemed part of the First World. Davis and Golden used data on "the percentage of economically active males not engaged in agriculture and the percentage of the population in cities of 100,000 or above in a large number of the countries in the world," in order to define the normal relationship between industrialization and urbanization. They then determine that countries whose rate of urbanization is significantly higher than normal in relation to their rate of industrialization are "overurbanized." The authors calculate an "expected" level of urbanization based on the rates of urbanization of other countries of the world at similar levels of industrialization (measured by percentage of males not engaged in agriculture). A few countries in particular that Davis and Golden measured as having higher levels of urbanization than expected were Egypt, Greece, and South Korea. Davis and Golden did not see overurbanization as a necessarily negative phenomenon, but rather a statistical reality that could have its challenges but would ultimately be self-correcting as an appropriate balance was found between levels of urbanization and industrialization. Scholars on overurbanization agree that N.V. Sovani was one of the first to discount Davis and Golden's argument, as he found that the connection between urbanization and industrialization was more significant in underdeveloped countries than developed ones, suggesting that Davis and Golden's measure of a "normal" relationship between urbanization and industrialization was not valid.

The definition offered by the United Nations and UNESCO in 1956 took a different approach to measuring overurbanization: the diachronic approach. A 1956 UNESCO report measured overurbanization historically, emphasizing that "at comparable levels of urbanization developed countries of today had a correspondingly greater proportion of their labour force engaged in non-agricultural occupations" than underdeveloped countries. Authors on overurbanization give the examples of France, the United States, Germany, and Canada as developed and often mention the continents of Asia and Africa as well as the region of Latin America as underdeveloped. This historical approach was applied to Asia in the report, which argued that because a smaller percentage of the labor force was engaged in non-agricultural activities than certain Western developed countries had at similar levels of urbanization, Asia was overurbanized. However, this method has been criticized by scholars who argue that it supports an ethnocentric idea that all countries follow the same path of development. Furthermore, economist N.V. Sovani argued that the evidence offered is not consistent with the development trajectories of developed countries, pointing out specific examples of developed countries such as Switzerland where high levels of industrialization did not correspond with high levels of urbanization. Sociologists John D. Kasarda and Edward Crenshaw pointed out that it was not so much the rate of urbanization of developing countries that was greater, but the absolute numbers of people migrating.

Scholars reference N.V. Sovani as a researcher who questioned whether to accept the 1950s definition of overurbanization. His debunking of the formerly accepted definitions of overurbanization encouraged further scholarly analysis and attempts to redefine the term. Sovani suggested that claims of overurbanization in underdeveloped countries stemmed from the perception that rapid urbanization had negative consequences. However, he claimed that there still lacked evidence for the idea that rapid urbanization actually made areas worse off. Economist David R. Kamerschen found that there was little statistical evidence to support that "rapid urbanization in underdeveloped countries hampers economic growth," suggesting that the phenomenon of overurbanization is questionable.

Following Sovani's work, several scholars offered alternative definitions, many of which included not just the relationship between population growth and their means of employment but also the ability of the urban area to provide public services, reflecting that economic development lagged behind population growth in a multitude of ways. Several scholars also increasingly embraced a negative connotation for the term. Urban planner John Dyckman suggested that inability to accommodate the expectations of migrants to the city made overurbanization a threat to social order. Economists Philip Graves and Robert Sexton argue that the definition of overurbanization must "involve the presence of negative net external effects for the city size in question," suggesting that as long as "positive external social benefits" from rapid urbanization dominate negative externalities, overurbanization is not at play. Gugler defined overurbanization by two factors: that migration to cities led to a "less than optimal allocation of labor between the rural and urban sectors" and that migration to cities "increases the costs of providing for a country's growing population." Sociologist Glenn Firebaugh disagreed, arguing that if overurbanization is caused by overpopulation, that overpopulation of rural areas could be worse than overpopulation of urban areas.

From its origins, the term has been used to differentiate between countries that are considered developed and underdeveloped. Davis and Golden considered a country to be underdeveloped if over half its economically active males were employed in agriculture. The UNESCO report frequently used the terms "developed" and "Western" in conjunction. Gugler and others use the terms "third world" and "first world" in their discussion.

== Causes ==
Sociologist John Shandra states that arguments about the causes of overurbanization fall into five groups:

1. The rural-push and urban-pull perspective;
2. The economic modernization perspective;
3. The political modernization perspective;
4. The neo-Malthusian perspective;
5. The dependency perspective.

Shandra's analysis of several variables related to each of these categories suggested that all of these arguments have significant evidence except for the economic modernization perspective. Recent scholars believe that a variety of these factors are relevant.

=== The rural-push and urban-pull perspective ===
The biggest cause of overurbanization emphasized by scholars is rural-urban migration and the "push" factors associated with it, including "increased population, diminished size of holdings, and absentee landlord exactions." Specifically, lower death rates as a result of demographic transition lead to less available land and fewer opportunities for rural residents. The larger process of urbanization is characterized both by these factors that "push" migrants away from their homes as well as factors that "pull" them towards new areas. Davis and the UNESCO report both discuss that overurbanization is affected by the "push" factors away from rural areas being stronger than the "pull" factors. Pull factors towards urban areas include expansion of economic opportunity and the infrastructure of cities as administrative centers Shandra recognizes the relationship between push and pull factors, arguing that rural conditions, specifically environmental scarcity, cause decreasing income, decreased stability, and increased health risks, leading many to respond by migrating to urban areas. For example, drought in Brazil and Deforestation in the Philippines has made many rural residents' former manner of livelihood impossible, forcing them to move to the nearest city. Because migrants are primarily motivated by factors pushing them out of rural areas rather than factors such as demand for labor pulling them to the city, these rural-urban migrants often find themselves unemployed or quitting "low productive agricultural employment to [enter] yet another section marked by low productivity employment, namely handicraft production, retail trading, domestic services in urban areas." A study done by sociologist Glenn Firebaugh showed that agricultural density, a strong indicator of land constraint, and the presence plantation agriculture both have significant effects on overurbanization. These findings were later reversed by sociologist Bruce London, who emphasized that urban migration was not the only potential response to agricultural density.

Sovani argues that there is little evidence for the greater role of "push" factor of increased population in rural areas, as even countries where there is little pressure for land experience this phenomenon, but that instead the opportunity for higher income is responsible for the excessive migration and pressure on cities, as the salary for an unproductive job in an urban area was almost always higher than the salary for unproductive work in a rural area. Graves and Sexton also emphasize that individuals move despite negative factors such as overcrowding, suggesting that individuals still see urban migration as an overall benefit. They argue that if the benefits do indeed outweigh the costs for society as a whole, then the term "overurbanization" is not appropriate to describe the phenomenon. Gugler argues that while the benefits outweigh the costs for an individual migrating to an urban area, greater costs such as resource scarcity and widespread unemployment and poverty are present when this occurs at a larger scale.

Sovani also argues that the definition of overurbanization as developed by scholars in the 1950s and 1960s suggests some sort of limits to population density "beyond which the resulting social situation is abnormal," which he argues need to be defined more clearly. Such unsupportable growth would suggest that the cause of overurbanization is urbanization happening too rapidly for a city's level of economic development. Dyckman would call this the "pre-takeoff period." However, several scholars have questioned the validity of the connection between urbanization and industrialization.

=== The economic modernization perspective ===
The economic modernization perspective on the causes of overurbanization is based on modernization theory, which argues that a hierarchical progression exists from pre-modern to modern society. An explanation of overurbanization from this perspective was given by sociologist Jeffrey Kentor, who wrote that under modernization theory, urbanization results from development and industrialization creating jobs and infrastructure. This argument has been criticized by those who do not ascribe to the assumption that there is a linear path of development that all countries follow.

=== The political modernization perspective ===
Shandra's take on the political modernization perspective asserts that environmental degradation causes overurbanization, because the destruction of natural resources in rural areas lowers production and increases poverty and health risks. Supporters of the political modernization perspective suggest that a strong civil society supports lower levels of overurbanization. The presences of international non-governmental organizations (INGOs) in rural areas, political protests, and democratic government all have the ability of limiting rural-push factors by limiting factors that lead to resource scarcity. INGOs can reduce overurbanization by stimulating alternative employment outside of agriculture, supporting grassroots movements, and improving rural conditions, such as by providing clean water. Considering the role of political protest, Shandra offers the example of the Chipko movement in India, where local women protested deforestation. Protection of this natural resource "eliminated the causes (i.e., income risk and health effects) that facilitate rural to urban migration by protecting a natural resource base by which rural residents in India depended for their existence." Given these considerations, Shandra argues that repressive regimes that do not respond to the desires of the public are more likely to cause higher rates of urbanization than democratic governments.

=== The neo-Malthusian perspective ===
The neo-Malthusian perspective is closely related to rural-push and urban-pull factors, but it suggests that the cause behind these factors is population growth, which leads to ecological problems, decreasing agricultural activity, and increased rural poverty. These factors then push rural residents to the city.

=== The dependency perspective ===
The dependency perspective on the causes of overurbanization is based on dependency theory, which argued that economic and political systems rendered less developed countries dependent on developed countries, which used developing countries for resources, labor, and markets. Proponents of the dependency perspective argue that rural-push and urban-pull factors are not only a result of population growth and resource scarcity, but that these factors, among others, are caused by the exploitation of developed countries and the capitalist principles they operate under. This is to say that "a comprehensive understanding of Third World urbanization cannot focus solely on intra-national, rural-push, urban-pull explanations...but must explicitly incorporate the impact of international capitalist forces." This holds that the negative rural-push factors are a result of the manipulation of developed countries. Michael Kentor found that dependence on foreign investment had a lagged effect on urbanization, meaning that urbanization rates increased a few years after foreign companies began profiting in developing countries. Jeffrey Timberlake and Michael Kentor found in their analysis of 69 less developed countries that there was a significant relationship between dependence, as measured by level of foreign investment, and overurbanization. Additionally, a study done by Bruce London found that factors related to dependency were not only connected to rapid urbanization, but also the negative aspects of urbanization such as urban inequality.

== Effects ==
=== Economic ===
Davis and Golden did not see overurbanization as an inherently negative phenomenon, but as a statistical fact that would likely correct itself, as "urbanization will fall off sharply or industrialization will gain a new impetus." Expanding on the latter, they suggest that overurbanization could spur industrial growth, modernization of agriculture, and social change. Even in the case of overurbanization, some of the positive effects of urbanization could be present in regards to economic growth, such as the development of more efficient economics due to scale, technological developments, diversity of both products and occupations, as well as "the greater opportunity of occupational and social mobility and greater readiness to adapt." For example, they argue that industrialization supports greater efficiency of agriculture through technology, an advantage for the productivity of rural farmers as well as urban consumers. However, Firebaugh argues that great efficiency is often a result of an increasingly capital-intensive system, which creates inequality between large and small landowners, such as in the Latin American latifundia system. Furthermore, Timberlake and Kentor found in their analysis of economic growth and overurbanization that countries that experienced increases in levels of overurbanization experienced less economic growth. Economic opportunities are lacking due to "saturated urban labor markets" that exclude much of both the rural and urban populations truncated opportunity structures in rural areas. Furthermore, high infrastructural costs stymie growth.

=== Social ===
The UNESCO report emphasized the negative effects of overurbanization, detailing "low levels of living" as "inadequate housing, the almost complete absence of mass sanitary facilities, the presence of filth, squalor, repugnant odours, disease and high mortality" and "large urban groups who have little or no access to educational facilities." Several scholars have agreed that overurbanization puts a strain on the wellbeing of urban residents due to the lack of adequate public services.

Davis and Golden also argue that greater density of dissatisfied impoverished masses could improve conditions to the extent that it provokes the government to enact change to avoid revolution. Dyckman agreed that overurbanization lends itself to the potential for revolution, though he saw this as a potentially destabilizing factor as the conditions would lead to social dissatisfaction and seizure of control by revolutionary leaders. He saw informal squatter settlements as breeding ground for revolutionary activity.

=== Overtourism ===
The concentration of the population in a few points of interest naturally leads to such points becoming overcrowded.

=== Employment ===
Despite arguing the potential for economic growth, the UNESCO report also states that overurbanization prevents urban areas and countries from utilizing their "potential human and physical resources" due to unemployment, under-employment, and misemployment. The idea that rural-push factors are stronger than urban-pull factors in cases of overurbanization suggests that it is population pressure in rural areas rather than the pull of urban jobs that leads to rural-urban migration. Migrants often end up unemployed, as overall urbanization rates rise faster than industrialization and the expansion of the urban job base.

In addition to high levels of unemployment, overurbanization is characterized by underemployment and misemployment. Underemployment is defined as the "underutilization of labor," or when available laborers are not working at their full capacity due to seasonal variation in production or excess employment of laborers for the amount of work that needs to be done. Misemployment is defined as unproductive labor, meaning that efforts are considered to "contribute little to social welfare," such as the full-time labor of begging.

While these phenomena are all caused by excessive rates of migration to cities, it is notable that unemployment and underemployment are also problems in rural areas as well. Often unemployment in rural areas is what pushes residents to the city, where better economic opportunities are expected.

== Proposed solutions ==
A UNESCO report that discussed overurbanization in Asia suggested initial proposals that addressed rural-push factors such as lack of economic opportunity and low productivity by improving agricultural technology and supporting rural industries. Furthermore, rural misery could be reduced by bringing industrialization into rural areas to increase employment and wages and to support the development of infrastructure that creates a "more desirable community environment." The UNESCO report also considers the role of governments in committing to providing adequate housing as well as regional planning that takes into consideration social concerns. However, these considerations, among others that propose dealing with unemployment, have been criticized as "skirting the issue by addressing 'symptoms' of overurbanization" rather than the root cause.

Later authors also emphasized improving rural conditions to combat overurbanization. Gugler suggested channeling more resources to rural areas and fighting the tendency to neglect rural areas with what economist Michael Lipton deemed "urban bias," the tendency to allocate funds and public works to cities, where the elite and middle classes reside. For example, monetary policies that create artificially low prices for agricultural products harm farmers while creating a surplus for the government. Thus a reallocation of resources to agricultural workers would help shift this system that favors urban elites over the rural poor. Sociologists York Bradshaw and Mark Schafer studied the relationship between INGOs and overurbanization and found that state expenditures towards development were less effective than the role of INGOs. While INGOs were shown statistically to decrease overurbanization, the presence of INGOS did not decrease the effects of foreign capital investment, which is considered one of the root causes of overurbanization by dependency theorists. They and Shandra agree that INGOs can play an important role in decreasing overurbanization by supporting rural communities by promoting both economic and infrastructural development as well as the role of civic society.

== Case studies ==
=== Egypt ===
Davis and Golden offered the example of Egypt as a country that significantly deviated from the normal relationship between urbanization and economic development. They argue that population growth in rural areas created congestion, poverty, and unemployment. They point out that only 10 percent of economically active males in rural areas are employed in non-agricultural work, compared to 50 percent in France, suggesting that there are no economic opportunities in rural areas in Egypt outside of farming. Egypt had similar levels of urbanization in the late 1940s to Sweden, Switzerland, and France, but significantly lower levels of industrialization. Based on the normal relationship Davis and Golden found between urbanization and industrialization, Egypt had higher levels of urbanization than expected. Dyckman gives an example of a consequence of urbanization in Cairo when he explains that urban dwellers actually have lower literacy rates than those in surrounding villages due to a lack of development.

=== South Korea ===
Both the UNESCO report and Davis and Golden identify South Korea as an example of an overurbanized country. Davis and Golden discussed how following the removal of the Japanese after World War II, urbanization continued, but economic growth stagnated. Population growth and urbanization were driven by migration from overpopulated rural areas, even though the majority of jobs available were still in the agricultural sector. The 17.2 percent of Korea's population that were urban dwellers in 1949 were attributed largely to the presence of rural migrants.

== See also ==
- Developed country
- Developing country
- Migration
- Industrialization
- Rural flight
- Urban primacy
- Urbanization
