= Urban bias =

Urban bias refers to a political economy argument according to which economic development is hampered by groups who, by their central location in urban areas, are able to pressure governments to protect their interests. It is a structural condition of overurbanization and its growth leads to a saturated urban labour market, truncated opportunity structures in rural areas, overburdened public services, distorted sectoral development in world economies, the isolation of large segments of the urban and rural population from the fruits of economic development, and economic decline due to the high costs of urban development.

Groups often said to have an 'urban bias' include governments, political parties, labor unions, students, laws, civil servants and manufacturers. These interests are portrayed as often not reflecting the comparative economic advantage of the country, usually a less-industrialized country whose comparative advantage is considered to be export agriculture.

Among the leading scholars to claim urban bias are Michael Lipton and Robert H. Bates.

The notion of urban bias is particularly popular among those who advocate neoliberal economic policies. Many World Bank publications use the notion of urban bias to support policies oriented toward export agriculture.

== See also ==
- Metropolitan bias
- Rural bias
