= Metropolitan bias =

A metropolitan bias is a prejudice in favor of concentrated urban population centers over more diffuse rural or suburban population areas. This is described most often as a type of media bias in coverage of topics, as a general form of favoritism, or as a criticism raised in data gathering such as statistical studies and polling.

== In media ==
Television programs, especially news, have been criticized for covering urban centers disproportionately.

In the United Kingdom, the BBC was perceived to have a bias towards the London metropolitan area, prompting ITV to launch in the 1950s as a series of independent regional companies.

In 2007, BBC's coverage bias toward London was criticized by Scottish First Minister Alex Salmond (SNP) as "hideously White City", and Welsh MP Adam Price (Plaid Cymru) threatened to withhold part of the license fee over "minuscule" Wales coverage.

The BBC corporation's governance body, BBC Trust, produced a 2014 report indicating bias against coverage related to rural England, though noting Wales and Scotland coverage was more balanced.

== In resource allocation ==
The term 'metropolitan bias' has been used to describe unequal allocation of resources, such as governmental services.

In one study, Ferré et al (2010) noted that, in the 1970s to 1980s, "urban bias" was a tendency of governments to disproportionately tax rural activities like agriculture and invest in urban-based industrialization. By 2010, they state, 75% of those living in extreme poverty (defined as less than $1 per day) lived in rural settings. In eight developing countries examined (Albania, Brazil, Kazakhstan, Kenya, Mexico, Morocco, Thailand, and Sri Lanka), the authors noted a disproportional amount of services for the poor were available in urban areas. They concluded that "any strategy for urban poverty reduction that places greater focus on, or allocates more resources to, metropolitan areas, suffers from a 'metropolitan bias' analogous to the urban bias of old."

== In other areas ==
In 2000, several architects from Scotland and Wales made claims of metropolitan bias in selections for the Stirling Prize after five out of seven designs shortlisted by judges were located within London, despite the scope of the contest at the time extending to all of Europe. Critics also described the list as "London-centric". The chairman representing the judges in the contest dismissed the claims, noting that the first Stirling Prize was awarded to a building in Manchester.

A 2024 study found that large language models tend to provide more accurate information for major metropolitan areas than for smaller cities and regions.

== See also ==
- Urban bias
