= Land Reform in Developing Countries =

2009 book by Michael Lipton

Land Reform in Developing Countries: Property rights and property wrongs
- Author: Michael Lipton
- Language: English
- Genre: Nonfiction
- Publisher: Routledge
- Publication date: 2009
- Publication place: United Kingdom
- Media type: Print (hardback, paperback, ebook)
- Pages: 456
- ISBN: 978-0-415-09667-6
- OCLC: 428389261
- Dewey Decimal: 333.3'1091724 - dc22
- LC Class: HD1333.5.L57 2009

Land Reform in Developing Countries: Property Rights and Property Wrongs is a 2009 book by the Leontief Prize–winning economist Michael Lipton. It is a comprehensive review of land reform issues in developing countries and focuses on the evidence of which land reforms have worked and which have not.

== Summary ==
The introduction defines land reform as comprising "laws with the main goal of reducing poverty by substantially increasing the proportion of farmland controlled by the poor, and thereby their income, power or status"(the appendix gives a more precise definition). It then expands on what is meant by poverty and how land reform still "matters", especially as according to Lipton "land is poor people's main productive asset" and "at least 1.5 billion people today have some farmland as a result of land reform, and are less poor, or not poor, as a result." However, for Lipton, "huge, inefficient land inequalities remain, or have re-emerged, in many low-income countries. Land reform remains both 'unfinished business' (...) and alive and well."

Chapter 1 analyses the goals of stakeholders involved in land reform: public authorities, landowners, farmers and other directly affected persons as well as the goals for land reform advocated by outsiders, from aid donors to economists and philosophers. Land reform normally advances one widely shared goal, equality of opportunity, but it can retard another, liberty to enjoy 'legitimate' property rights. This chapter looks at the trade-offs and how various types of claimed land reform affect these goals and others, notably poverty reduction, sustainability, economic efficiency and economic growth.

Chapter 2 explores the impact of land reform and land policy on farm and non-farm growth and efficiency. It looks at the long debate on whether "there is an inverse relationship (IR) in labour-abundant countries", such that "small farms produce more, per hectare per year, than large farms". Lipton concludes that careful and recent work in Africa and elsewhere confirms that, "mainly due to the IR plus land scarcity, redistributive land reform in developing countries normally increases farm output."

Chapters 3-6 review the experience with different types of policies, variously labelled as land reform. They ask: are these genuine land reforms in the sense of seeking, and moving towards, "farmland-based reduction of gross, unearned inequality and hence of poverty"? These main types of land reform are:

- the paradigm: 'classic' land reform, leading to land transfers from big to small farms (chapter 3)
- laws to stop, restrict, register, enable or encourage tenancy, overall or for particular types (chapter 4)
- other tenurial rules, for example titling of land ownership or control (chapter 4)
- collectivisation into State farming, collective farming or co-operative farming, which according to Lipton have normally proved a 'terrible detour' or 'land deform' (chapter 5)
- decollectivisation (which may be land reform if resulting land ownership is fairly equal) (chapter 5)
- other alleged paths to the aims of land reform: land consolidation, settlement, tax reform, etc. (chapter 6)
- new wave (decentralised, market-friendly and/or non-confiscatory) land reform (chapter 6)

Chapter 7 reviews the persistent allegation that land reform is dead, or was so effectively avoided that it never lived. Lipton asks the questions: Where has it happened on the ground, how much and when? He also asks: Is land reform still happening and where it is not dead, ought it to be? Lipton concludes: "In many developing countries, land reform is a live, often burning, issue ... The debate about land reform is alive and well."

== Criticisms ==
The book overall received positive reviews and endorsements (see below). However, Andrew Dorward did have some "minor gripes" within his very positive review. He wished that it did not finish so abruptly and that it had a final chapter "summing up the main lessons from the book for the next generation of researchers, analysts and practitioners in the field." He would also have liked to have seen "more explicit attention to interactions of land reform with gender and the environment."

Abhijit Sen, while giving it an overall positive review, found that:

"To put it very bluntly, even after reading and re-reading, the final big picture may remain somewhat hazy to a reader seeking full clarity on matters involved. But this is perhaps what Lipton the economist really wants: to show that deep issues are involved, that many are currently being debated, and that the debate will continue."

He also finished his review with some further critiques, especially in relation to land reform in India:

"Indian readers will find much information in the book about other countries that is not usually available, and a flavour of issues still current elsewhere. On the Indian situation, however, there is no clarion call in this book. If anything, there are references to the Planning Commission, and a sense that there is not much land left in really large holdings and that the way forward may only involve a guarantee to the poor of homestead land with at least garden plots. The book does not deal specifically with tribal land issues in India or the Scheduled Tribes and Other Traditional Forest Dwellers (Recognition of Forest Rights) Act, which is the most recent land reform measure. And, although mentioned, rural resistance to the acquisition of agricultural land for non-agricultural purposes is not a part of its discourse. The definition of land reform that Lipton uses limits him to considering only the distribution of farmland and does not extend to the conversion of land use from sown area to another category. Lipton does not reveal his mind about the new accumulation of land that is occurring across the world. This is a pity, because much of what is presently happening in China, India, and even other parts of the world including Africa, cannot really be understood without extending the canvas of land issues beyond the farm itself."

== Endorsements ==
The book received positive endorsements from a wide range of authors, including Jeffrey Sachs, Nicholas Stern, Amartya Sen, Gordon Conway, Nancy Birdsall, Paul Collier, Akin Adesina and Pramod K. Mishra.

== Reviews ==
This is, to put it conservatively, an important book. It is the first comprehensive and up to date review of land reform issues in the developing countries in many years. In my opinion, it is one of the most important books ever written about agriculture in the developing countries. This conclusion is based in part on the book’s impressive breadth of coverage and depth of analysis, in part on its timeliness, in part on the centrality of land reform issues to poverty and inequality reduction (and more generally to societal health in many countries), and in part on the urgent current need for very strong ammunition in the battle with the opponents of such reform.

— Albert Berry, Development and Change

The study of land reform has been an enduring theme in Michael Lipton's long distinguished career. Land Reform in Developing Countries: Property Rights and Property Wrongs is a comprehensive, scholarly and passionate collation of his years of research and policy analysis on this issue. A packed, tightly argued and a very comprehensive review of empirical literature in a wide and heavily research field, it is an essential read for anyone concerned with the history and implementation of land reform - a topic of continuing importance and interest.

— Andrew Dorward, Journal of Agricultural Economics

Michael Lipton has produced a unique work drawing upon the author's extraordinary expertise in rural development. Lipton takes on a great, complex, and contentious topic, land reform, and does justice to this huge topic. He delves deeply and widely, producing a text that is remarkable in its scope, insights, and historical knowledge. He never fears to point out the true complexities of topics that are all too often over-simplified. Lipton’s work is also extremely timely, as the world turns its attention once again to smallholder agriculture after decades or relative neglect. Scholars, students, and policy makers in all parts of the world will turn to this new study with enormous benefit and with gratitude to Lipton for his remarkable efforts.

— Jeffrey Sachs, endorsement in the book

Land and Land Reform are, in several developing countries including India, live issues - perhaps more critical today than they were decades ago. The unique analytical framework, remarkable empirical evidence and insight, and a modern perspective in this path-breaking new book of Prof. Lipton are invaluable to researchers and policymakers in their endeavour to address problems of poverty, inequality and sustainability.

— Pramod K Mishra, chairman, Gujarat Electricity Regulatory Commission; former secretary to Government of India, Ministry of Agriculture, Department of Agriculture and Cooperation, endorsement in the book

== See also ==
- Land reforms by country
- Land consolidation
