= Water stress and urbanization =

Water stress is increasingly affecting urbanization. Water stress arises through slum development, anarchic construction, water scarcity, the absence of financial structures, the absence of basic structures, the absence of infrastructure such as roads, bridges, sidewalks, signs, markets, schools, etc., can sometimes hinder the productivity of certain cities. Unfortunately, this phenomenon affects even the largest cities in the world; in 2018, 300,000 were recorded in the world, housing around 40% of the world's urban population.

== Overview ==
Urbanization is a demographic phenomenon that results in a tendency for the population to concentrate in cities, and the thresholds that separate the urban world from the rural world vary greatly on a planetary scale: in fact, the UN's list includes one hundred different definitions of urban population. According to the 2017 World Bank report, urbanization goes hand in hand with economic growth, which implies greater productivity and higher standards of living, but this is not always the case in all cities and societies around the world.

Today, 56% of the world's population, or 4.4 billion people, live in cities. This trend is set to continue: by 2050, with the current number of urban dwellers doubling, almost seven out of ten people in the world will live in urban areas. With 80% of global GDP generated by cities, urbanization, if managed and harnessed, can be one of the most powerful drivers of change, while promoting sustainable growth through increased productivity and innovation. At the same time, rapid urbanization poses many challenges, including the need to respond effectively and efficiently to the growing demand for affordable housing, the need to build new transport networks, and the need to promote access to essential infrastructure, basic services and jobs, particularly for the one billion urban poor living in informal settlements. These informal neighborhoods, found almost everywhere in the world, are at the origin of the slum phenomenon experienced by both Southern and Northern countries, and the words and expressions used to describe them have peculiarities that seem to refer to socio-spatial discrimination. In Kenya we speak of Kijiji, in the Philippines of Iskwater, in Indonesia of Kanpung, in Sudan of Shammasa, in Latin America of Barrios in Venezuela, of Pueblos Jovenes in Argentina, in North America of Villas Miserias and Colonias populares in Mexico, of Hot Spots in the United States, of Favelas in Brazil, of Banlieue in France, of Ollas in Colombia, of Zones de non droit in Haiti, etc. All of this, show that this phenomenon is spreading uncontrollably throughout the world and will continue to do so if nothing is done to stop it. At the same time, water is an essential resource.

== Challenge of urbanisation ==
As mentioned in the World Bank report (2017), urbanization is accompanied by significant challenges, such as increased demand for housing, expansion of transportation networks, but also the most important, which is the response to basic services, namely the need for water, sanitation and hygiene. And currently, water scarcity is a central concern for a large number of cities. The main problem of urbanization is the rapid growth of urban population, in addition to inadequate planning, pollution, poverty, competing demands for resources. All these poorly controlled factors contribute to increasing the risk of water scarcity, especially since water consumption in the world's cities is expected to double by 2025 In addition, climate change, a phenomenon we are already facing, will alter the precipitation regime, which could have an impact on available water reserves or cause disasters, depending on whether we are affected by drought or floods.

== Environmental consequences ==
Urbanization has many environmental consequences. In all urban areas there are numerous impacts on the environment such as air pollution, water pollution, etc.

Excessive urbanization creates risks (fragilization of soils, pollution, plundering of natural resources)

Urbanization is one of the causes of the erosion of biodiversity. It is also one of the main causes of species extinction.

== Water right in urban areas: case of Haiti ==
According to WHO (2002), "Water is essential for life and health. The human right to water is therefore fundamental to a healthy and dignified life. It is a prerequisite for the realization of all other rights". For this reason, access to safe drinking water and access to sanitation have been recognized as fundamental human rights and thus constitute a legal obligation for governments. Indeed, guaranteeing access to water and sanitation for all is a legal obligation. And on 28 July 2010, the right to safe drinking water and sanitation was "recognized" as a human right, essential for the full enjoyment of life and the exercise of all human rights. But the situation in Haiti is very different, because it has followed a different path, and its potential benefits have been overshadowed by enormous challenges that require immediate action. The destructive effects of the 2010 earthquake, which came on the heels of a devastating 2008 hurricane season and was followed by the even more devastating Hurricane Matthew in 2016, further weakened the resources that could have generated greater prosperity throughout the country, as most efforts were focused on recovery and reconstruction. The creation of new communities in the metropolitan area has contributed to the growth of the lawless zone, Canaan, whose population of approximately 200,000 in 2016, constitutes one of the largest slums in the metropolitan area. of Haiti with a significant water shortage, as demand exceeds supply with an excessive price. Ultimately, the global water challenge remains enormous, but some countries in the South, such as Haiti, are already experiencing the negative impacts of water scarcity.
