= Michael Lipton =

English economist (1937–2023)

Michael Lipton CMG FBA
- Born: 13 February 1937; London, England
- Died: 1 April 2023 (aged 86)

Academic career
- Field: Development economics
- Information at IDEAS / RePEc

Michael Lipton CMG FBA (13 February 1937 – 1 April 2023) was an English development studies economist specializing in the study of rural poverty in developing countries, including issues relating to land reform and urban bias. He spent much of his career at the University of Sussex, but also contributed to the work of international institutions, such as the World Bank's 2000/2001 World Development Report on poverty.

Lipton was a reader, then a professorial fellow at the university's Institute of Development Studies 1967–94, and later research professor at the University of Sussex's Poverty Research Unit, which he founded.

== Biography ==
Lipton was born in London on 13 February 1937 to Helen and Leslie Lipton. Both his parents were German Jewish immigrants from Hamburg. He studied at the Haberdashers' Aske's Boys' School before going to Balliol College, Oxford, graduating with a degree in Philosophy, politics and economics. During his time there he won the university prize for economics and took a fellowship at All Souls College, Oxford. He later went on to get a degree from the Massachusetts Institute of Technology.

Lipton was made a professorial fellow at the University of Sussex's Institute of Development Studies in 1967. He remained associated with the institution for over 30 years. He established the Poverty Research Unit at the university in 1994.

Lipton was elected to the British Academy in 2006 and shared the 2012 Leontief Prize. He was appointed Companion Order of St Michael and St George, CMG, for his contributions to international development, in 2003.

== Research ==
Lipton's research focused on developmental studies, specifically, rural development and poverty reduction. He started his research in the village of Kavathe Yamai in the Indian state of Maharashtra between 1965 and 1966. Lipton's interest in this area was influenced by Austrian born British economist Paul Streeten during his time at Oxford, and by his research for Swedish economist Gunnar Myrdal, author of Asian Drama: An Inquiry Into the Poverty of Nations (1968).

Lipton's partnership with Myrdal helped him write "The Theory of the Optimising Peasant" (1968), a paper in which he challenged the then prevailing assumption that small and poor farmers were backward and conservative. He argued that these poor farmers acted rationally and managed their resources more efficiently and intensively than rich farmers. The prevailing views were based on American economist Theodore Schultz's views, which noted that farmers in developing economies were efficient but poor. Lipton's studies showed that these farmers' unwillingness to adopt new crop varieties, such as those introduced in the middle of the 20th century during the Green Revolution, was due to the higher risk of crop failure, and prevailing hunger, and destitution. However, when later generations of these crops, and the introduction of inputs like fertilizers helped reduce crop loss risk, poor farmers adopted these crops and the underlying technologies. Lipton wrote against the prevailing notion about poor farmers that they were wasteful, by stating that grain losses on their farms were often low. Lipton further built on these ideas in his book, The Crisis of Indian Planning (1969), which he co-edited with Paul Streeten.

Lipton's work helped challenge the notion that development could only result from industrialization, which often came at the expense of rural areas through high taxation. His book, Why Poor People Stay Poor: Urban Bias and World Development (1977), studied the behaviours of the policy makers and urban elites and their discrimination against the rural poor.

Lipton also explored the linkages between agriculture, and health and nutrition, highlighting the ways in which rural people's health and nutrition were guided by agricultural policies. In his book Agriculture-Health Linkages (1988), co-authored with economist Emanuel de Kadt for the World Health Organization, Lipton demonstrated how to make agricultural policy and institutions provide for the health needs of women and the rural poor.

Lipton worked with various governmental and non-governmental agencies, advising countries such as India, Bangladesh, Botswana, Ethiopia, Sudan and South Africa. He served as an advisor to the World Bank, where he studied poverty. His book New Seeds and Poor People (1989) combined his study of poverty and earlier studies of agriculture. An obituary in the Financial Times called the work, the "definitive study of the Green Revolution". He subsequently studied technology-based interventions in agriculture including genetic engineering. He also wrote the first Rural Poverty report for the United Nations' International Fund for Agricultural Development in 2001. He also proposed land reforms in southern Africa which were built on market-based approaches to solve historical inequalities.

In addition to his academic research, Lipton was an accomplished chess player and published several books on the subject, including The Two-Move Chess Problem (1966) and Collected Chess Problems of Michael Lipton (2016). His 1956 lecture to the British Chess Problem Society titled "The German Two-Mover" contributed to Britain's development to the forefront of the modern two-movers. He was the editor of the chess problems section of the Sunday Citizen and Correspondence Chess. He served as the president of the British Chess Problem Society between 2000 and 2002.

== Personal life ==
Lipton married Merle Babrow, a South African historian and political economist, in 1966. His wife predeceased him in 2022. The couple had one son. Outside of his academic life, Lipton was interested in classical music and poetry.

Lipton died on 1 April 2023, at the age of 86.

== Selected works ==
- Why Poor People Stay Poor: Urban Bias and World Development (1977, 1988)
- New Seeds and Poor People (with Richard Longhurst, 1989)
- Does Aid Work in India? (with John Toye, 1991)
- Successes in Anti-poverty (1998, 2001)
- Land Reform in Developing Countries: Property rights and property wrongs (2009), Routledge, ISBN 978-0-415-09667-6
- Lipton, Michael (1 December 1963). "Crecimiento equilibrado y crecimiento desequilibrado en los países subdesarrollados" [Balanced and unbalanced growth in underdeveloped countries]. Estudios económicos (in Spanish). 2 (3): 55–84. doi:10.52292/j.estudecon.1963.983. ISSN 2525-1295.
