= PAHS =

PAHS may refer to:

== Schools ==
- Patan Academy of Health Sciences, Patan, Lalitpur, Nepal
- Perth Amboy High School, Perth Amboy, New Jersey, United States
- Pipestone Area High School, Pipestone, Minnesota, United States
- Pottsville Area High School, Pottsville, Pennsylvania, United States
- Princess Anne High School, Virginia Beach, Virginia, United States
- Plano Academy High School, Plano, Texas, United States
- Phoenixville Area High School, Phoenixville, Pennsylvania, United States

== Other uses ==
- Huslia Airport (ICAO code), airport in Huslia, Alaska
- Polycyclic aromatic hydrocarbons (PAHs)

== See also ==
- PAH (disambiguation)
