= Civil aviation =

All non-military aviation

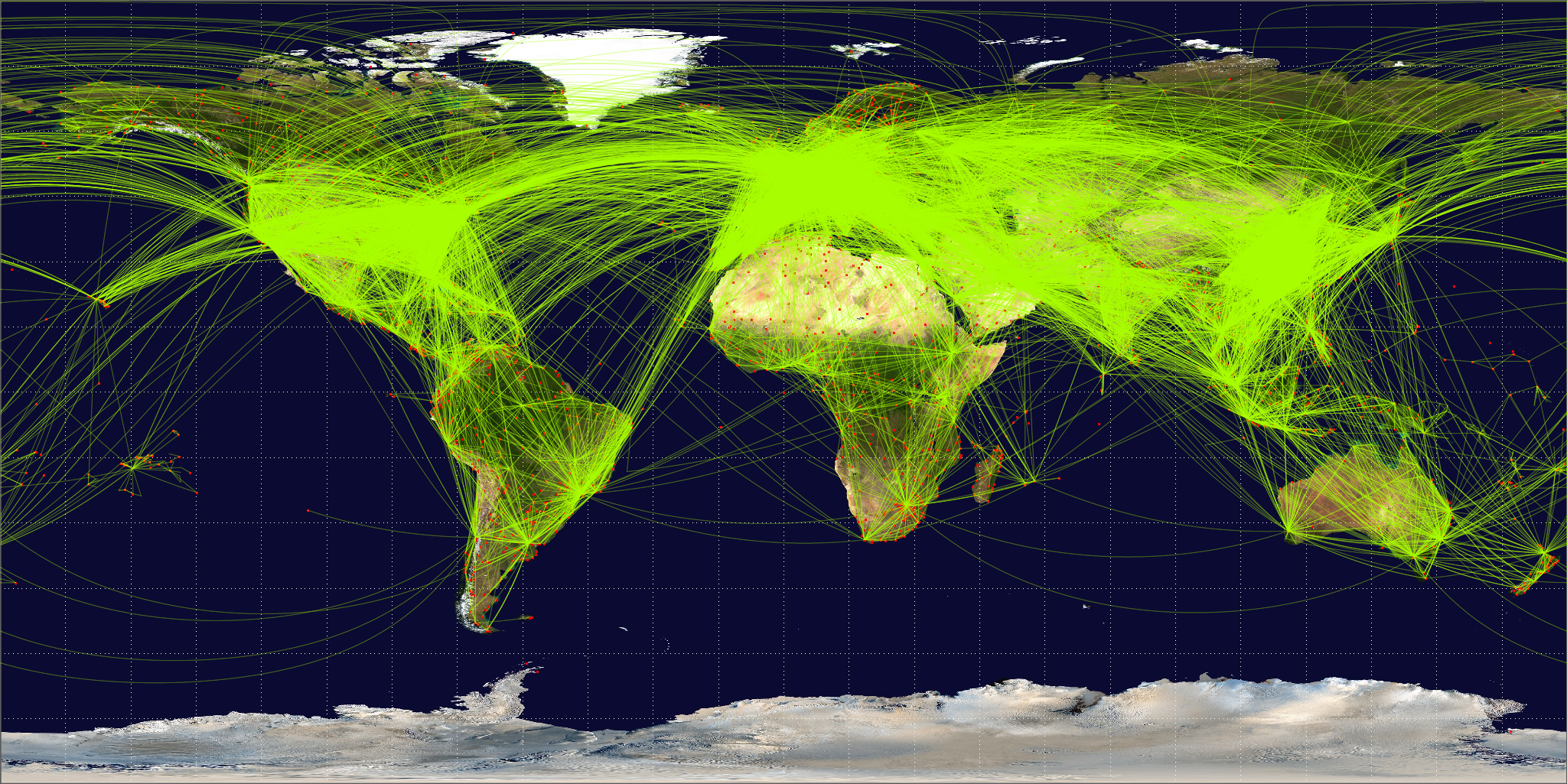
Scheduled airline traffic in 2024

Civil aviation is one of two major categories of flying, representing all non-military and non-state aviation, which can be both private and commercial. Most countries in the world are members of the International Civil Aviation Organization and work together to establish common Standards and Recommended Practices for civil aviation through that agency.

Civil aviation includes three major categories:

- Commercial air transport, including scheduled and non-scheduled passenger and cargo flights
- Aerial work, in which an aircraft is used for specialized services such as agriculture, photography, surveying, search and rescue, etc.
- General aviation (GA), including all other civil flights, private or commercial

Although scheduled air transport is the larger operation in terms of passenger numbers, GA is larger in the number of flights (and flight hours, in the U.S.) In the U.S., GA carries 166 million passengers each year, more than any individual airline, though less than all the airlines combined. Since 2004, the U.S. airlines combined have carried over 600 million passengers each year, and in 2014, they carried a combined 662,819,232 passengers.

Some countries also make a regulatory distinction based on whether aircraft are flown for hire, like:

- Commercial aviation includes most or all flying done for hire, particularly scheduled service on airlines; and
- Private aviation includes pilots flying for their own purposes (recreation, business meetings, etc.) without receiving any kind of remuneration.

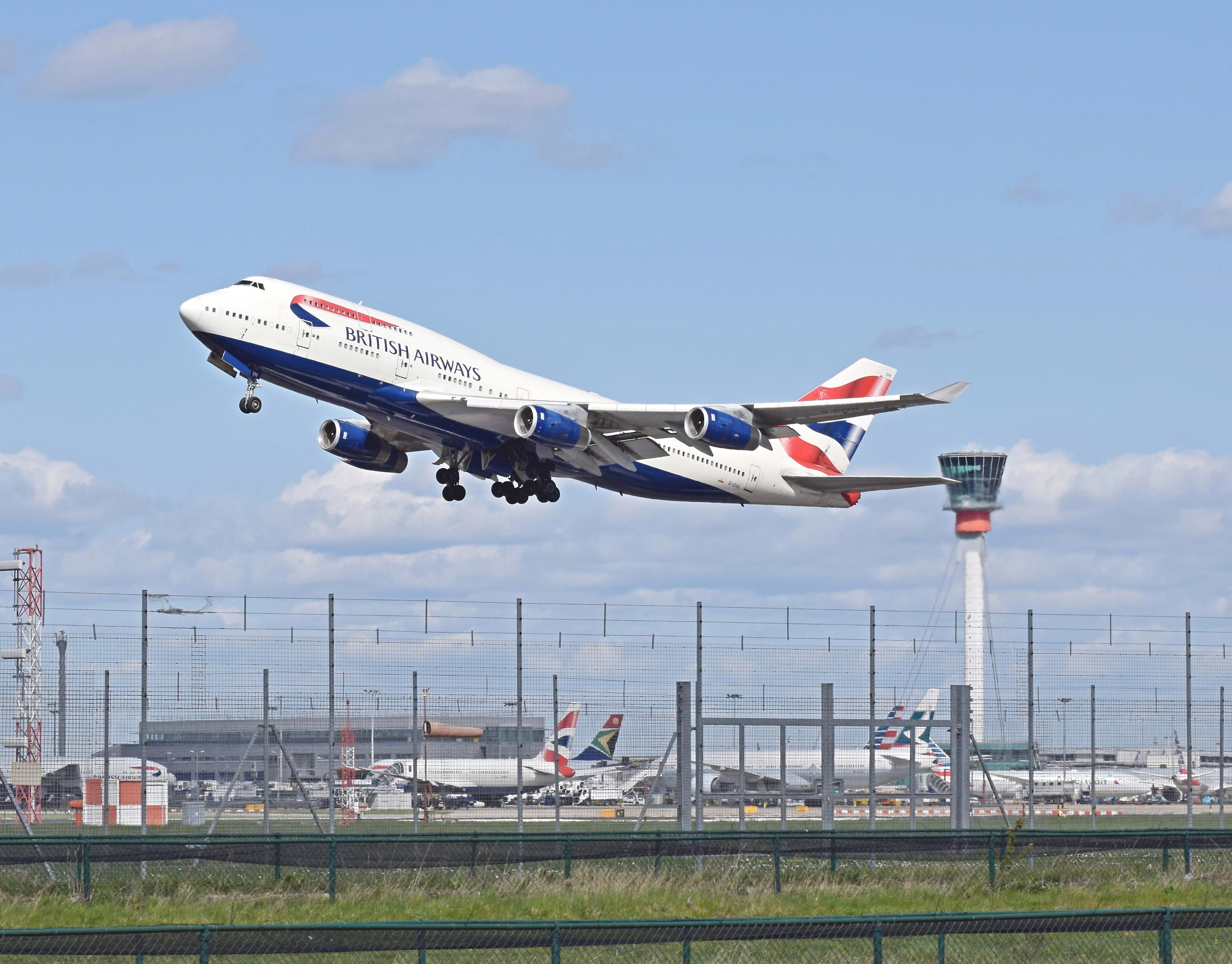
A British Airways Boeing 747-400 departs London Heathrow International Airport. This is an example of a commercial aviation service.

All scheduled air transport is commercial, but general aviation can be either commercial or private. Normally, the pilot, aircraft, and operator must all be authorized to perform commercial operations through separate commercial licensing, registration, and operation certificates.

Non-civil aviation is referred to as state aviation. This includes military aviation, state VIP transports, and police/customs aircraft.

== History ==
=== Postwar aviation ===
After World War II, commercial aviation grew rapidly, using mostly ex-military pilots to transport people and cargo. Factories that had produced bombers were quickly adapted to the production of passenger aircraft like the Douglas DC-4. This growth was accelerated by the establishment of military airports throughout the world, either for combat use or training. These could easily be turned to civil aviation use. The first commercial jet airliner to fly was the British de Havilland DH.106 Comet. By 1952, the British state airline British Overseas Airways Corporation had introduced the Comet into scheduled service. While it was a technical achievement, the airplane suffered a series of highly public failures, as the shape of the windows led to cracks due to metal fatigue. By the time the problems were overcome, other jet airliner designs such as the Boeing 707 had already entered service.

== Civil aviation authorities ==
The Chicago Convention on International Civil Aviation was originally established in 1944; it states that signatories should collectively work to harmonize and standardize the use of airspace for safety, efficiency and regularity of air transport. Each signatory country, of which there are at least 193, has a civil aviation authority (such as the Federal Aviation Administration in the United States) to oversee the following areas of civil aviation:

- Personnel licensing — regulating the basic training and issuance of licenses and certificates.
- Flight operations — carrying out safety oversight of commercial operators.
- Airworthiness — issuing certificates of registration and certificates of airworthiness to civil aircraft, and overseeing the safety of aircraft maintenance organizations.
- Aerodromes — designing and constructing aerodrome facilities.
- Air traffic services — managing the traffic inside of a country's airspace.

== Statistics ==
The World Bank lists monotonously growing numbers for the number of passengers transported per year worldwide, except for a strong decrease during the COVID-19 pandemics. The preliminary all-time high was in 2019 with 4.46 billion passengers. Likewise, the number of registered carrier departures worldwide has reached a peak in 2015 with almost 33 million takeoffs. In the U.S. alone, the passenger miles "computed by summing the products of the aircraft-miles flown on each inter airport segment multiplied by the number of passengers carried on that segment" have reached 607,772 million miles (978,114×10^{6} km) in 2014 (as compared to highway car traffic with 4,371,706 million miles (7,035,579×10^{6} km)). The global seasonally adjusted revenue passenger kilometers per month peaked at more than 550 billion kilometres (3,700 AU) (~6.6 trillion per year, corresponding to roughly 2000 km per passenger) in January 2016, a 7% rise over one year. The passenger numbers are distinctively more volatile than general economic indicators. Global political, economic or health crises have an amplifying effect.

Global air travel demand reached a record high in 2024, with total full-year traffic rising 10.4% compared to 2023 and surpassing pre-pandemic (2019) levels by 3.8%. The overall passenger load factor also reached a record 83.5% for the year, reflecting record efficiency in filling available seats industry-wide.

== See also ==
- Air travel
- Military aviation
- Private aviation
- CUNY Aviation Institute
- International Civil Aviation Organization
- National Aviation Intelligence Integration Office
- Transport in the European Union
