= NACD =

NACD is an acronym for:

- National Association for Cave Diving
- National Association of Corporate Directors
- National Association of Conservation Districts, a non-profit organization supported by the Natural Resources Conservation Service
