= Kleppa =

Kleppa is a surname. Notable people with the surname include:

- Herman Kleppa (born 1996), Norwegian footballer
- Magnhild Meltveit Kleppa (born 1948), Norwegian politician
- Ole J. Kleppa (1920–2007), Norwegian-born physical chemist
