= Paul F. McMillan =

Scottish-born chemist (1956–2022)

Paul Francis McMillan
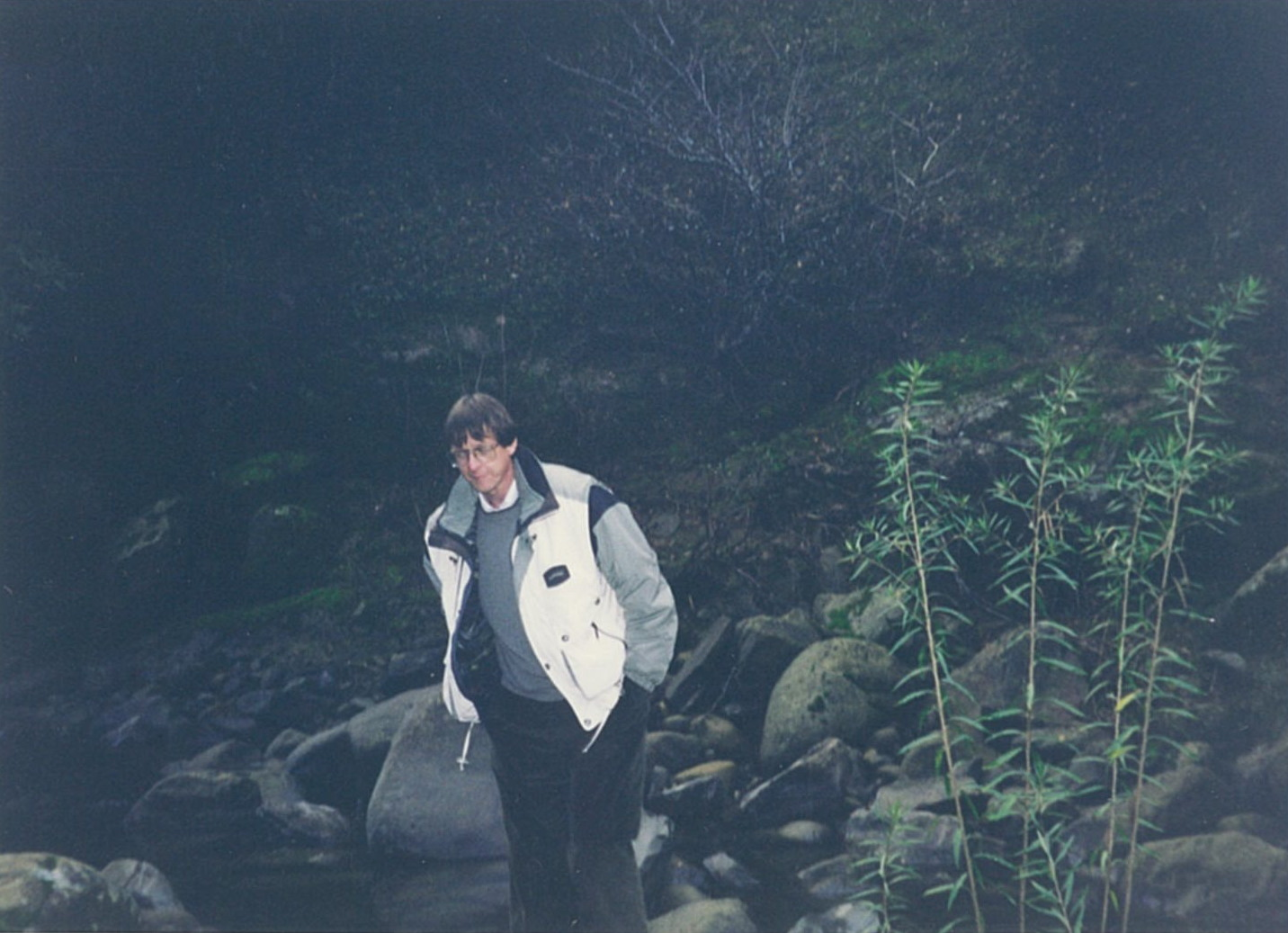
- McMillan in 1977
- Born: 3 June 1956; Edinburgh, Scotland
- Died: 2 February 2022 (aged 65); London, England
- Occupations: Academic and scientist
- Scientific career
- Fields: Spectroscopy; Materials; Extreme Conditions
- Institutions: University College London, Arizona State University
- Thesis: A structural study of aluminosilicate glasses by Raman spectroscopy (1981)
- Doctoral advisor: Alexandra Navrotsky, John Holloway

Paul Francis McMillan (3 June 1956 – 2 February 2022) was a British chemist who held the Sir William Ramsay Chair of Chemistry at University College London. His research considered the study of matter under extreme conditions of temperature and pressure, with a focus on phase transitions, amorphisation, and the study of glassy states. He has also investigated the survival of bacteria and larger organisms (tardigrades) under extreme compression, studies of amyloid fibrils, the synthesis and characterisation of carbonitride nanocrystals and the study of water motion in confined environments. He has made extensive use of Raman spectroscopy together with X-ray diffraction and neutron scattering techniques.

== Early life and education ==
McMillan was born in Edinburgh, Midlothian, and brought up in Loanhead, a small mining and farming village at the base of the Pentland Hills. He attended Lasswade High School, where he graduated with the Marshall Memorial medal. He then studied for a bachelor's degree in chemistry at the University of Edinburgh. After graduating, McMillan moved to Arizona State University, where he researched geochemistry with John Holloway and Alexandra Navrotsky. His doctoral research was in using vibrational spectroscopy to investigate the structures of silicate glasses.

== Research and career ==
McMillan worked as a postdoctoral fellow at Arizona State University, where he installed one of the first micro-beam Raman spectroscopy instruments in the US. He used Raman spectroscopy to study high pressure minerals and materials. He was hired to a teaching position at Arizona State University in 1983, and promoted to Professor in the Department of Chemistry and Biochemistry in 1993. He was appointed Director of the Center for Solid State Science in 1997 and was named Presidential Professor of the Sciences. In 2000 he was awarded the Brunauer Cement Award of American Ceramic Society. In 2000, McMillan returned to the United Kingdom, where he was made Professor of Solid State Chemistry at University College London, an appointment jointly held with the Royal Institution. McMillan has also held visiting positions at the Universités of Nantes and Rennes, the Ecole Normale Supérieure and Université Claude Bernard.

McMillan's research involved the exploration of solid state chemistry under extreme high pressure and high temperature conditions using diamond anvil cells. New compounds and materials are prepared and studied at up to a million atmospheres and thousands of degrees Celsius using spectroscopy and synchrotron X-ray diffraction. He studied the properties and structure of liquids, amorphous solids and biological molecules at high pressure. McMillan has contributed across numerous fields and has published work relating to solid state inorganic/materials chemistry, high pressure-high temperature research, amorphous solids and liquids, vibrational spectroscopy, synchrotron X-ray and neutron scattering, mineral physics, graphitic carbonitrides, battery materials and the response of bacteria to high pressures.

In 2015 McMillan was a panellist on Melvyn Bragg's In Our Time on BBC Radio 4.

== Personal life ==
McMillan died in London on 2 February 2022, at the age of 65.

== Selected publications ==
- C. A. Angell; K. L. Ngai; G. B. McKenna; P. F. McMillan; S. W. Martin (15 September 2000). "Relaxation in glassforming liquids and amorphous solids". Journal of Applied Physics. 88 (6): 3113–3157. doi:10.1063/1.1286035. ISSN 0021-8979. Wikidata Q56552594.
- Paul F McMillan (1 September 2002). "New materials from high-pressure experiments". Nature Materials. 1 (1): 19–25. doi:10.1038/NMAT716. ISSN 1476-1122. PMID 12618843. Wikidata Q73082944.
- P. H. Poole; T. Grande; C. A. Angell; P. F. McMillan (17 January 1997). "Polymorphic Phase Transitions in Liquids and Glasses". Science. 275 (5298): 322–323. doi:10.1126/SCIENCE.275.5298.322. ISSN 0036-8075. Wikidata Q57567948.
