= Hermann Schmalzried =

German solid state chemist

- Born: 21 January 1932 (age 93); Koblenz, Germany
- Education: University of Stuttgart
- Known for: solid state reaction kinetics
- Scientific career
- Institutions: Technical University of Clausthal; Leibniz University Hannover
- Thesis: Röntgenographische Untersuchungen über die Aushärtung einer AlMgZn-Legierung (1958)
- Doctoral advisor: Richard Glocker
- Other academic advisors: Theodor Förster; Carl Wagner
- Notable students: Alexandra Navrotsky (postdoc)

Hermann Schmalzried (born 21 January 1932 in Koblenz) is a German chemist known for his work in physical chemistry, especially on the thermodynamics and kinetics of solid state chemistry.

== Education and career ==
Schmalzried received his diploma (with a diploma thesis on the fluorescence of benzopyrene) from Theodor Förster at the University of Stuttgart and received his doctorate in 1958 at the Roentgen Institute of the University of Stuttgart with Richard Glocker (1890-1978) and was a postdoc with Carl Wagner at the Max Planck Institute for Biophysical Chemistry in Göttingen, a pioneer in solid state chemistry. He habilitated in 1966 at the Leibniz University Hannover on the topic of disorder in ternary ionic crystals. In 1966, he became a full professor at the Technical University of Clausthal and in 1975 at the Leibniz University Hannover. He was Courtesy Professor at Cornell University and Schottky Professor at Stanford University.

He wrote two textbooks on chemical reactions in solids, which were internationally standard works. He also dealt with thermodynamics of solids and electrochemistry. His group worked closely with Alan Lidiard's group in England.

== Honors and awards ==
Schmalzried received the Wilhelm Jost Memorial Medal in 1994 and the Bunsen Medal in 2013. He is "External Scientific Member" of the Max Planck Institute for Biophysical Chemistry in Göttingen, member of the Göttingen Academy of Sciences, the Leopoldina, corresponding member of the Austrian Academy of Sciences and member of the Academia Europaea (1989). He was awarded an honorary doctor at the University of Stuttgart in 2003.

== Bibliography ==
=== Reviews ===
- Schmalzried, H. (1963). "Solid-State Reactions". Angewandte Chemie International Edition in English. 2 (5): 251–254. doi:10.1002/anie.196302511. ISSN 0570-0833.
- Schmalzried, Hermann (1965). "Point defects in ternary ionic crystals". Progress in Solid State Chemistry. 2: 265–303. doi:10.1016/0079-6786(65)90009-9.
- Schmalzried, H (1987). "Transport in Chemical Potential Gradients of Multicomponent Oxides". Annual Review of Materials Science. 17 (1): 149–160. Bibcode:1987AnRMS..17..149S. doi:10.1146/annurev.ms.17.080187.001053. ISSN 0084-6600.
- Schmalzried, Hermann; Backhaus-Ricoult, Monika (1993). "Internal solid state reactions". Progress in Solid State Chemistry. 22 (1): 1–57. doi:10.1016/0079-6786(93)90007-E.
- Schmalzried, Hermann (1994). "Die physikalische Chemie fester Stoffe". Berichte der Bunsengesellschaft für physikalische Chemie. 98 (11): 1365–1372. doi:10.1002/bbpc.19940981104.
- Schmalzried, Hermann (2000-01-01). "Chemical kinetics at solid-solid interfaces". Pure and Applied Chemistry. 72 (11): 2137–2147. doi:10.1351/pac200072112137. ISSN 1365-3075. S2CID 97902585.
- Schmalzried, Hermann (2004-12-01). "The Advent of Solid-State Thermodynamics, Kinetics and Electrochemistry in the 20th Century". Zeitschrift für Physikalische Chemie. 218 (12): 1385–1399. doi:10.1524/zpch.218.12.1385.53832. ISSN 2196-7156. S2CID 102100165.

=== Books ===
- Schmalzried, Hermann; Navrotsky, Alexandra (1975). Festkörperthermodynamik. Weinheim: Verlag Chemie. ISBN 3-527-25605-9. OCLC 2563765.
- Schmalzried, Hermann (1981). Solid state reactions. Weinheim; Deerfield Beach, FL.: Verlag Chemie. ISBN 978-3-527-25872-7. OCLC 7376597.
- Schmalzried, Hermann (1995). Chemical kinetics of solids. Weinheim: VCH. ISBN 3-527-29094-X. OCLC 31661771.
