= York College, City University of New York =

Senior college in Jamaica, Queens, New York, US

York College of The City University of New York
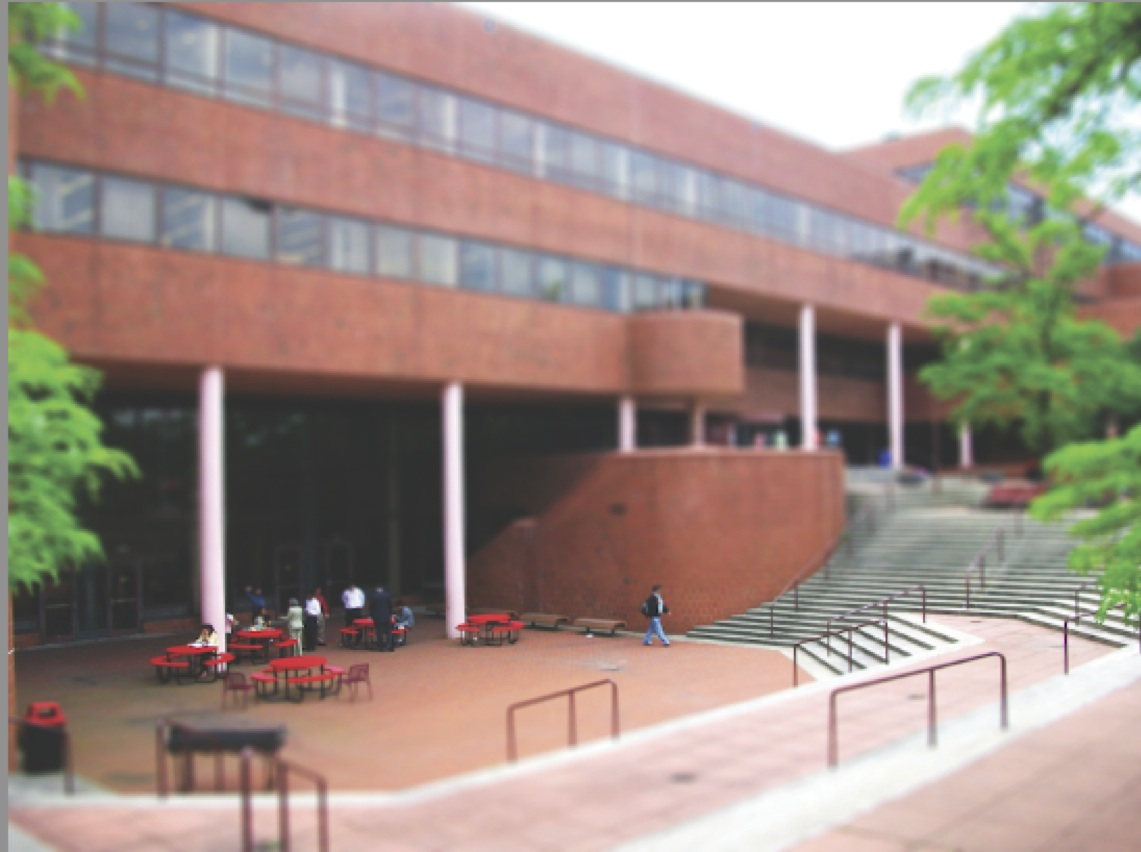
- Academic Core Building
- Motto: Sapere Aude, Incipe!
- Type: Public senior college
- Established: October 24, 1966; 60 years ago
- Parent institution: City University of New York
- Academic affiliations: Space-grant
- President: Claudia V. Schrader
- Location: Jamaica, Queens, New York, United States; 40°42′07″N 73°47′42″W
- Campus: Urban, 50 acres (20 ha)
- Newspaper: Pandora's Box
- Colors: White, Red & Black
- Mascot: Cardinal
- Website: york.cuny.edu

York College is a public senior college in Jamaica, Queens, New York City, United States. It is a senior college in the City University of New York (CUNY) system. Founded in 1966, York was the first senior college founded under the newly formed CUNY system, which united several previously independent public colleges into a single public university system in 1961. The college is a member-school of Thurgood Marshall College Fund. The college enrolls more than 6,000 students as of fall 2022.

== History ==
Established by the CUNY Board of Trustees in 1966, York opened in September 1967 with classrooms temporarily on the campus of Queensborough Community College in Bayside and in other rented facilities in Northeast Queens, before moving to rented quarters in Jamaica, Queens. The New York City fiscal crisis of the 1970s led to delays in construction of York's permanent campus and debates about whether the college would survive. The permanent campus opened in 1986. Prior to 1986, the mascot of the school was "Nomads", as they did not have a permanent home - and when the permanent campus opened, they became the "Cardinals."

== Academics ==
Undergraduate demographics as of Fall 2023
Race and ethnicity	Total
Black	38%
Hispanic	26%
Asian	22%
International student	5%
White	4%
Two or more races	3%
American Indian/Alaska Native	2%
Economic diversity
Low-income (Note: The percentage of students who received an income-based federal Pell grant intended for low-income students.)	56%
Affluent (Note: The percentage of students who are a part of the American middle class at the bare minimum.)	44%

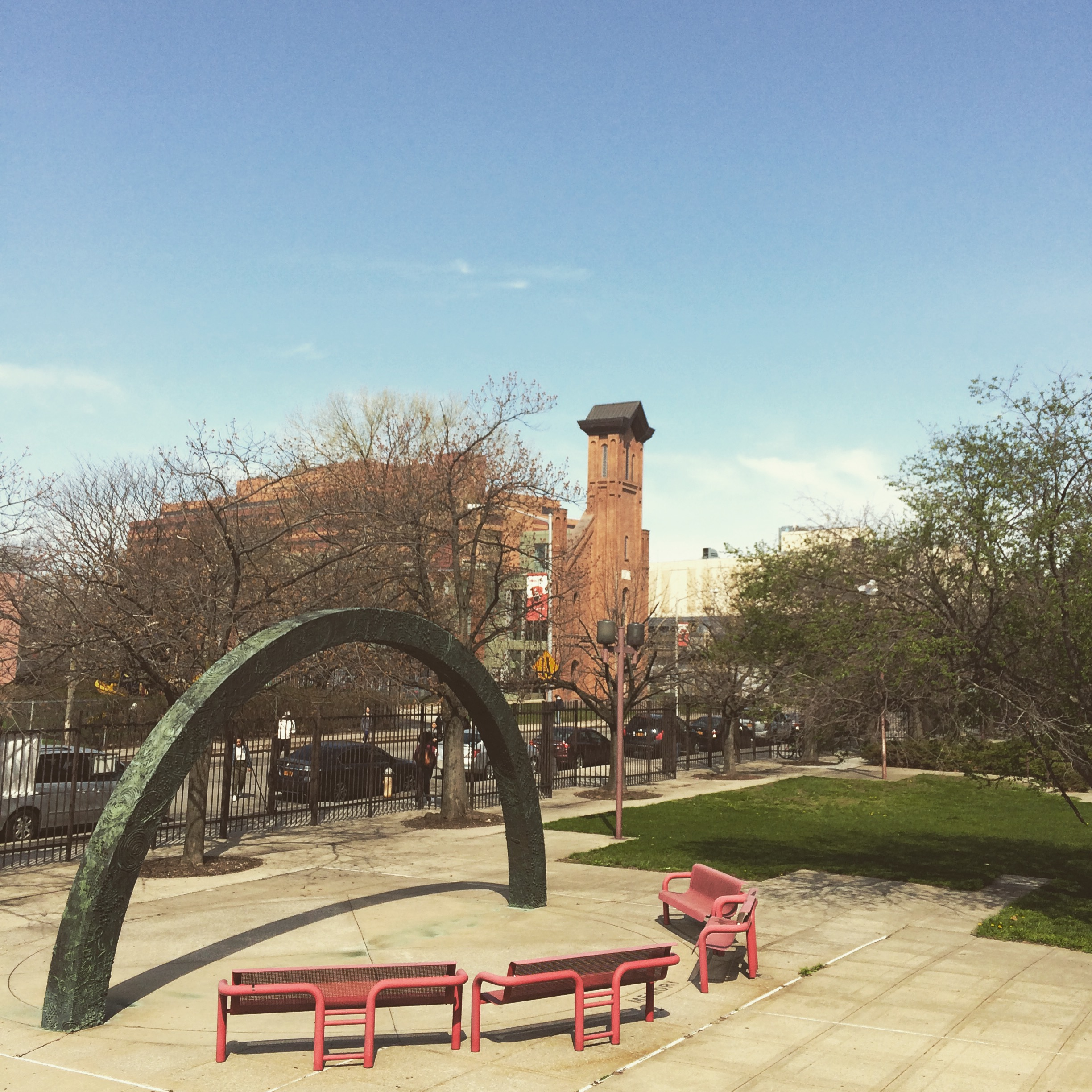
York College

The college is organized into three schools: the School of Arts & Sciences, the School of Business & Information Systems, and the School of Health Sciences and Professional Programs. Through those schools, York College offers B.A. and B.S. degrees. As of 2023–24, York offered master's degrees in six graduate programs.

In addition to the CUNY Aviation Institute, York College is home to the Northeast Regional Office and Laboratory of the U.S. Food and Drug Administration (FDA). The college's approximately 30,000 alumni serve in practically every professional endeavor, including medicine, research, law, business and social work. Approximately 40 percent of York's students study part-time, and in fall 2008 almost 700 new students were transfer students and over 5,000 were first-time freshmen.

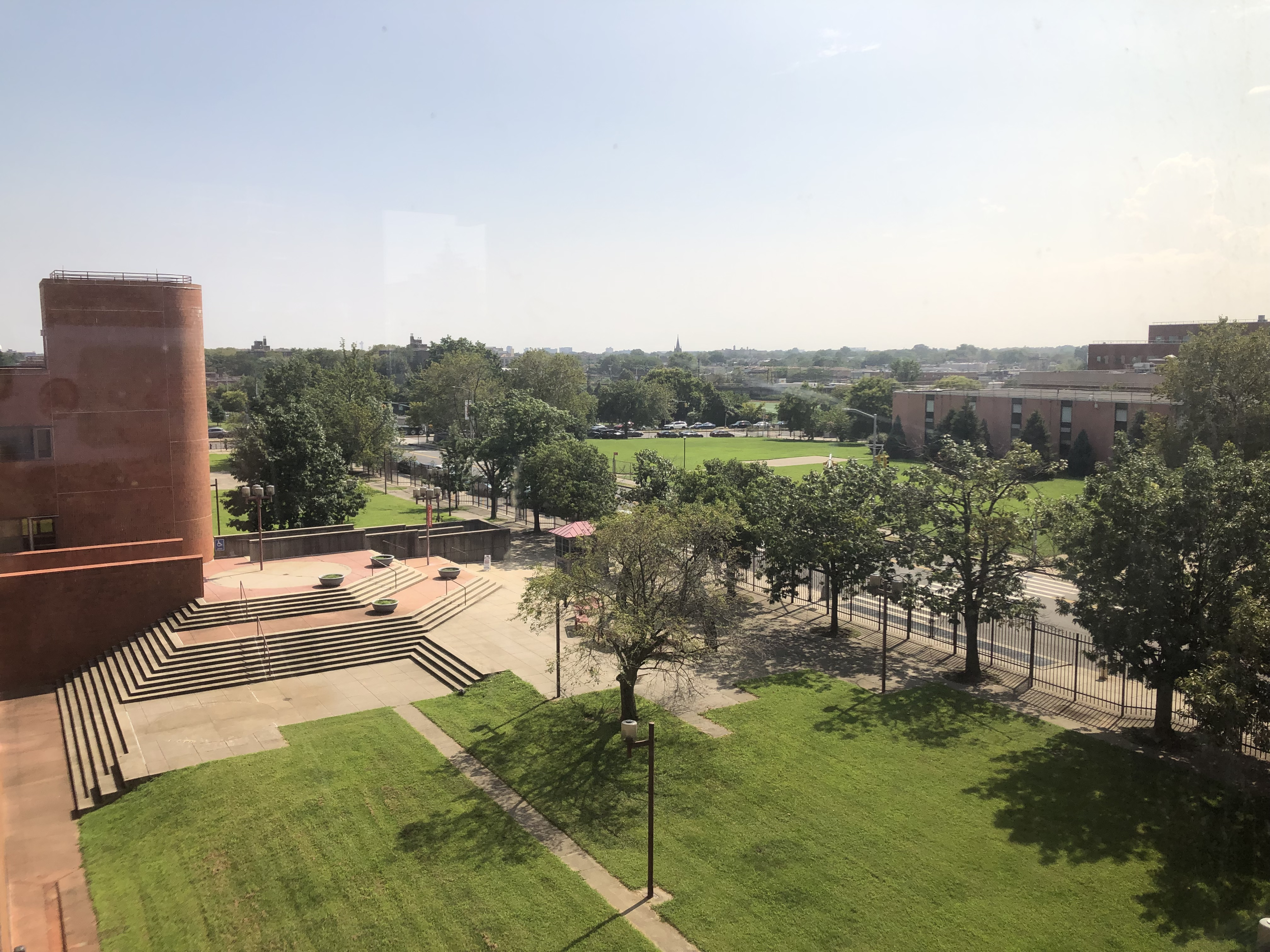
View of rear entrance plaza and campus view.

=== Governance ===
Faculty, students, and administrative staff participate in college governance, which is conducted according to procedures outlined in the bylaws of CUNY and in the York College Charter as approved by the Board of Trustees of CUNY. The York College Senate is the chief legislative body of the college. Reporting to the Senate are various standing college committees, which oversee such matters as curriculum and academic standards.

=== Accreditation ===
York is accredited by the Middle States Commission on Higher Education. Its teacher education programs are accredited by the Council for the Accreditation of Educator Preparation (CAEP). All education programs are registered by the New York State Department of Education and lead to New York State provisional certification after passing the written parts of the New York State Teacher Certification Examination after students pass the examination. York's Occupational Therapy Program is accredited by the Accreditation Council for Occupational Therapy Education (ACOTE) of the American Occupational Therapy Association (AOTA); The Physician Assistant Studies Program is accredited by the Accreditation Review Commission on Education for the Physician Assistant, Inc.; York's Social Work program is accredited by the Council on Social Work Education; and the Nursing Program by the National League for Nursing. A degree in accounting at York College includes all the educational requirements to sit for the Uniform Certified Public Accounting.

=== Graduation rate ===
Since 1971, York College has conferred 30,000 undergraduate and graduate degrees. York students progress toward graduation at different rates. Most students combine the role of student with that of employee and/or parent which may necessitate part-time enrollment or temporary leaves from their academic pursuits. In 2021, U.S. News & World Report reported an average 6-year graduation rate of 31%.

=== Location and facilities ===
At the heart of the 50-acre York College campus is the Academic Core Building, which opened in 1986 and houses classrooms, lecture halls, laboratories, art studios, the library, computer facilities, academic and administrative offices, as well as dining facilities. On adjacent super blocks are located the 1,500 seat Performing Arts Center, the Health and Physical Education facility, which includes a gymnasium and swimming pool, Classroom and Science Buildings, Athletic Fields and parking facilities. The Performing Arts Center was renamed the Milton G. Bassin Performing Arts Center in October 2014 after the York College's second president. Milton G. Bassin, who guided the school during the period from 1971 to 1991 and was instrumental in ensuring the school's survival through the fiscal crisis of the 1970s. Also located on the campus is the Illinois Jacquet Performance Space, dedicated for the famous jazz saxophonist who lived in Addisleigh Park, a jazz enclave in Jamaica. It is on the grounds of the adjacent Prospect Cemetery in the Chapel of the Sisters, the cemetery is on the National Register of Historic Places.

Student Activities works closely with the Student Government Association (SGA). SGA is composed of students elected by their peers to represent and advocate for all students.

Located a block away from the York College campus is the Jamaica Center–York College station on the New York City Subway, serving the E, J, and Z trains. The station was named for the college in 2026.

=== CUNY Aviation Institute ===
The CUNY Aviation Institute (AI) at York College was established in 2003 by a grant from the Port Authority of New York and New Jersey to promote high quality education and research for the aviation industry. The AI is headquartered in New York City and is located on the campus of York College.

In cooperation with local, national, and international partners the CUNY Aviation Institute develops teaching materials regarding airlines, airports, service providers, civil aviation authorities, and related industries. Furthermore, the CUNY Aviation Institute develops programs of study at all academic levels, including credit and non-credit courses.

The CUNY Aviation Institute also promotes research and academic exchange of ideas in the field of aviation and assists in the training of professional educators and researchers. CUNY Aviation Institute has a partnership network comprising the private sector, educational institutions, international organizations, trade associations, governments and other bodies with interest in aviation management.

== Athletics ==
York competes as an NCAA Division III member of the City University of New York Athletic Conference.

== Notable people ==
=== Faculty ===
- James Como was Professor of Speech and Rhetoric from 1968 to 2013
- Daisy Cocco De Filippis was Professor of Spanish, 1983–2002
- Ron Daniels Distinguished Lecturer in Political Science, Department of Behavioral Sciences, 2007–2018
- William Divale was Professor of Anthropology from 1973 to 2015, and Professor Emeritus, 2015–2020
- George Dorris, a dance historian who was managing editor of Dance Chronicle for thirty years, was Associate Professor of English and an original faculty member, 1967-1998
- Nancy Foner was Assistant Professor of Anthropology, 1970–1973
- Bruce Jay Friedman was Visiting Professor of English, 1974–1976
- Mandë Holford, former assistant professor of chemistry
- David Ignatow was Professor of English and Poet-in-Residence, 1968–1984
- Reatha King was Professor of Chemistry, 1968–1977, as well as serving as Associate Dean of the Division of Natural Sciences & Mathematics, and later Associate Dean of Academic Affairs
- Robert Parmet was Professor of History and an original faculty member, 1967-2025
- Eileen Southern was Professor of Music, 1968–1974
- Margaret Rose Vendryes was Professor of Art History, 2000-2022, except for a period of a few years when she worked in Massachusetts

=== Alumni ===
- Sal F. Albanese (1972), New York City politician and businessperson
- Carole Berotte Joseph (1971), first Haitian-born United States college president
- Andrew G. Campbell (1981), Dean of the Graduate School at Brown University
- Maryanne J. George (2015), American Christian musician
- George Grasso (1980), former NYPD First Deputy Police Commissioner and Judge
- Mandë Holford (1997), science diplomat, professor of chemistry at Hunter College, and member of the Council of Foreign Relations
- Belinda S. Miles (1983), President of Westchester Community College since 2015
- Deborah Persaud, (1981), virologist
- Gerald A. Reynolds (1989), Chair of the U.S. Commission on Civil Rights from 2004 to 2010
- James Siegel (1977), author and political advisor
