= Alexandra Navrotsky =

Physical chemist in the field of thermodynamics

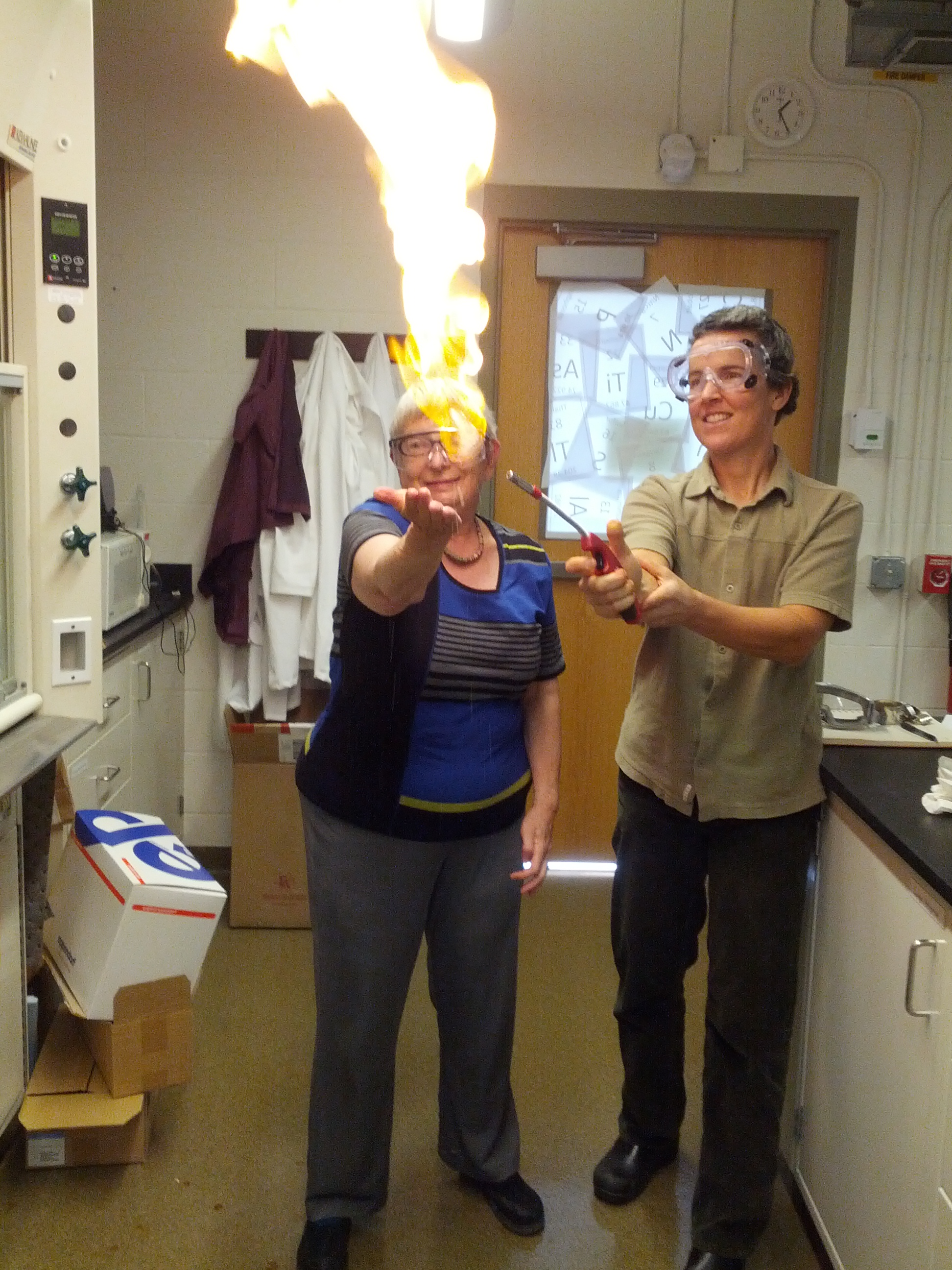
- Alexandra Navrotsky with Lee Penn performing the methane mamba chemical demonstration
- Born: June 20, 1943 (age 83)
- Education: Bronx High School of Science
- Alma mater: University of Chicago
- Awards: Member of the National Academy of Sciences
- Scientific career
- Workplaces: Arizona State University; Princeton University; University of California, Davis
- Doctoral advisor: Ole J. Kleppa
- Other academic advisors: Hermann Schmalzried
- Doctoral students: Patricia Dove; Nancy L. Ross
- Other notable students: Paul F. McMillan; Rebecca Lange
- Website: www.alexandra-navrotsky.com

Alexandra Navrotsky (born 20 June 1943 in New York City) is a physical chemist in the field of nanogeoscience. She is an elected member of the United States National Academy of Sciences (NAS) and the American Philosophical Society (APS). She was a board member of the Earth Sciences and Resources division of the NAS from 1995 until 2000.

In 2005, she was awarded the Urey Medal, by the European Association of Geochemistry.

The mineral navrotskyite which was discovered in Utah was named after her. Additionally, the American Ceramic Society named The Navrotsky Award for Experimental Thermodynamics of Solids to honor researchers in experimental solid-state thermodynamics.

== Early life and education ==
She graduated from Bronx High School of Science in New York. She received B.S. (1963), M.S. (1964), and Ph.D. (1967) in physical chemistry from University of Chicago, where she studied with Ole J. Kleppa.

== Career and research ==
In 1967, she went to Germany at the Clausthal University of Technology for postdoctoral work with Hermann Schmalzried. She came back to the U.S. in 1968 and continued her postdoctoral work at Pennsylvania State University. Then she joined the chemistry faculty at Arizona State University, for approximately five consecutive years. Later on, she moved to the Department of Geological and Geophysical Sciences at Princeton University in 1985. She became the chair of that department from 1988 to 1991. In 1997, she moved to University of California, Davis and became an Interdisciplinary Professor of Ceramic, Earth, and Environmental Materials Chemistry. In 2001, she was chosen as the Edward Roessler Chair in Mathematical and Physical Sciences. From 2013 to 2017, she was interim dean of Mathematical and Physical Sciences in the College of Letters and Sciences, at University of California, Davis. She is currently a Regents Professor at Arizona State University and has directed the Navrotsky-Eyring Center for Materials of the Universe since 2019. The center’s main goals are to better understand planet formation, composition, and evolution. Her specializations include: Solid-state chemistry, Ceramics, Physics and Chemistry of Minerals, Geochemistry.

=== Geochemistry ===
Since 1997, she has built a unique high temperature calorimetry facility. She has also designed and enhanced the instrumentation. Navrotsky introduced and applied the method for measuring the energetics of crystalline oxides of glasses, amorphous, nanophase material, porous materials of hydrous phases and carbonates also more recently nitrides and oxynitrides. Obtaining the thermo chemical data is used to understand the compatibility and reactivity of materials in technological and geological application. The energetics provides insight into chemical bonding, order-disorder reactions, and phase transitions.

Navrotsky's calorimetry has also been used in providing thermo chemical data for a variety of perovskite-related phases which has major consequences for convection and evolution on a planetary scale.

One of Navrotsky's works has shown that many zeolitic and mesoporous phases have energies only slightly higher than those of their stable dense polymorphs. The energy is associated with the presence or absence of strained bond angles not with the density. Navrotsky has produced significant research through her laboratory the Peter A. Rock Thermochemistry Laboratory. Here she has developed unique high temperature calorimetric techniques and instruments.

=== Nanomaterials ===
Her research is mainly focused on the structure and the stability of both natural and synthetic nanomaterials along with their dependence of temperature and pressure. She is also looking into the application of nanomaterials in geochemical pollutant transport in the air as it relates to the global climate change.

In 2026, Navrotsky and colleagues studied the energetics of water interactions with biomolecule-coated magnetite nanoparticles. Using calorimetric measurements, they investigated how coatings of protein, starch, and fatty acid altered the hydration energetics and surface properties of the nanoparticles. This study could help predict nanoparticle behavior in biological environments and inform the design of nanocarirers for drug delivery.

Nanoparticles are everywhere. You eat them, drink them, breathe them, pay to have them, and pay even more to get rid of them.

— Alexandra Navrotsky, 2010,

== Awards and honors ==
- In 2019, the mineral navrotskyite was named in honor of Alexandra Navrotsky.
- Alfred P. Sloan Fellow (1973)
- Mineralogical Society of America Award and Fellow (1981)
- American Geophysical Union Fellow (1988)
- Member, National Academy of Sciences (1993)
- President, Mineralogical Society of America (1992–1993)
- Honorary doctorate from the Faculty of Science and Technology at Uppsala University, Sweden (1995)
- Ross Coffin Purdy Award, American Ceramic Society Fellow (1995)
- Geochemical Society Fellow (1997)
- Alexander M. Cruickshank Award, Gordon Research Conference (2000)
- Hugh Huffman Memorial Award, The Calorimetry Conference (2000)
- Ceramic Educational Council Outstanding Educator Award (2000)
- American Ceramic Society Fellow (2001)
- American Ceramic Society, Best Paper Award of the Nuclear and Environmental Technology Division (2001)
- Benjamin Franklin Medal in Earth Science (2002)
- Highly Cited Researchers Award, ISI Thomson Scientific (2002)
- Fellow, The Mineralogical Society (Great Britain) (2004)
- Urey Medal, European Association of Geochemistry (EAG) (2005)
- Spriggs Phase Equilibria Award, American Ceramic Society (ACerS)(2005)
- Rossini Award, International Association of Chemical Thermodynamics (IACT)(2006)
- Harry H. Hess Medal, American Geophysical Union (AGU)(2006)
- Roebling Medal, Mineralogical Society of America (2009)
- W. David Kingery Award, American Ceramic Society (2016)
- Science Professional Member, The World Academy of Ceramics (2017)
- Czochralski Medal, European Materials Research Society (2022)

== Publications ==
- Alexander A. Demkov; Alexandra Navrotsky (2005). Materials fundamentals of gate dielectrics. Springer. ISBN 978-1-4020-3077-2.
- Her other publications can be found on: https://search.asu.edu/profile/3503975
