= TASF reagent =

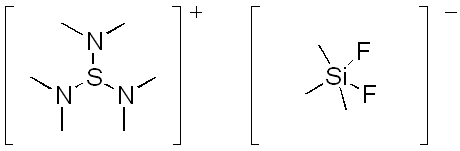

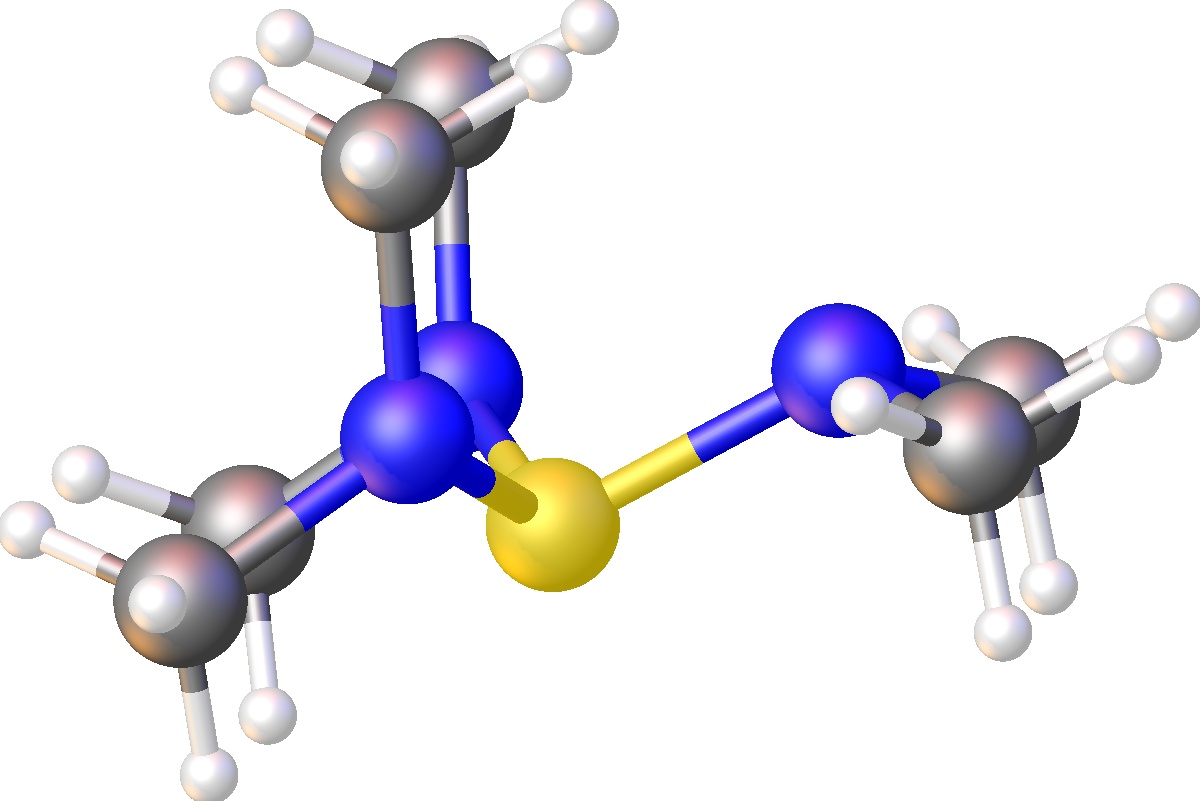

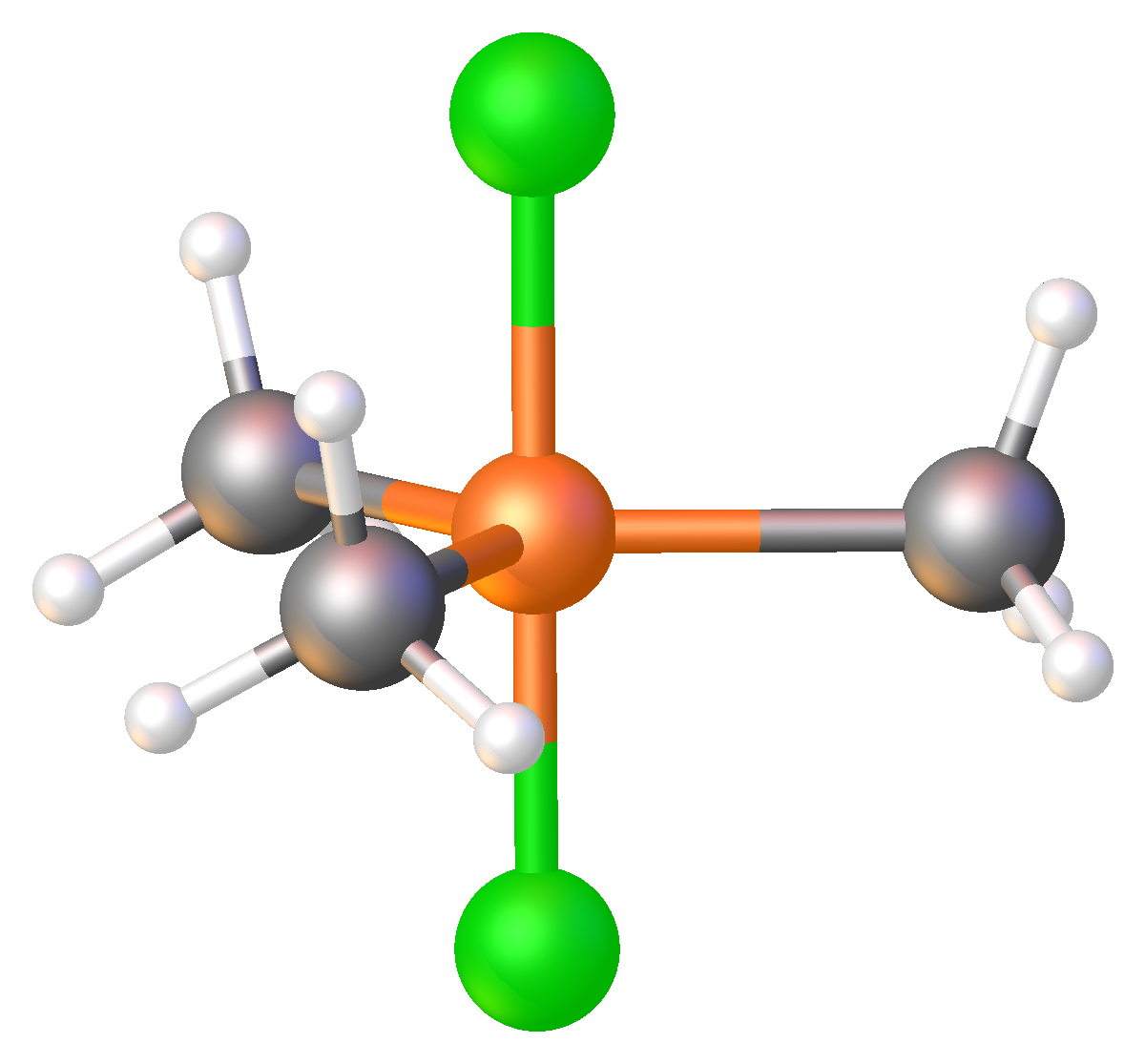

Names
- Preferred IUPAC name 2-(Dimethylamino)-1,1,3,3-tetramethyldiazathian-2-ium difluorotri(methyl)silanuide

Identifiers
| CAS Number | 59218-87-0 |
| 3D model (JSmol) | Interactive image |
| ChemSpider | 7971333 |
| ECHA InfoCard | 100.156.426 |
| PubChem CID | 9795567 |
| CompTox Dashboard (EPA) | DTXSID50430833 |
- InChI: InChI=1S/C6H18N3S.C3H9F2Si/c1-7(2)10(8(3)4)9(5)6;1-6(2,3,4)5/h1-6H3;1-3H3/q+1;-1 Key: JMGVTLYEFSBAGJ-UHFFFAOYSA-N; InChI=1/C6H18N3S.C3H9F2Si/c1-7(2)10(8(3)4)9(5)6;1-6(2,3,4)5/h1-6H3;1-3H3/q+1;-1 Key: JMGVTLYEFSBAGJ-UHFFFAOYAE
- SMILES: F[Si-](F)(C)(C)C.N([S+](N(C)C)N(C)C)(C)C

Properties
| Chemical formula | C_{9}H_{27}F_{2}N_{3}SSi |
| Molar mass | 275.48 |
| Appearance | Colorless solid |
| Melting point | 98 to 101 °C (208 to 214 °F; 371 to 374 K) |
- Except where otherwise noted, data are given for materials in their standard state (at 25 °C [77 °F], 100 kPa). verify (what is ?) Infobox references

The TASF reagent or tris(dimethylamino)sulfonium difluorotrimethylsilicate is a reagent in organic chemistry with structural formula [((CH_{3})_{2}N)_{3}S]^{+}[F_{2}Si(CH_{3})_{3}]^{−}. It is an anhydrous source of fluoride and is used to cleave silyl ether protective groups. Many other fluoride reagents are known, but few are truly anhydrous, because of the extraordinary basicity of "naked" F^{−}. In TASF, the fluoride is masked as an adduct with the weak Lewis acid trimethylsilylfluoride (FSi(CH_{3})_{3}). The sulfonium cation ((CH_{3})_{2}N)_{3}S^{+} is unusually non-electrophilic due to the electron-donating properties of the three (CH_{3})_{2}N substituents.

This compound is prepared from sulfur tetrafluoride:

3 (CH_{3})_{2}NSi(CH_{3})_{3} + SF_{4} → 2 (CH_{3})_{3}SiF + [((CH_{3})_{2}N)_{3}S]^{+}[F_{2}Si(CH_{3})_{3}]^{−}

The colorless salt precipitates from the reaction solvent, diethyl ether.

== Structure ==
The cation [((CH_{3})_{2}N)_{3}S]^{+} is a sulfonium ion. The S-N distances are 1.612 and 1.675 pm. The N-S-N angles are 99.6°. The anion is [F_{2}Si(CH_{3})_{3}]^{−}. It is trigonal bipyramidal with mutually trans fluorides. The Si-F distances are 176 picometers. The Si-C distances are 188 pm.
