= Photoacid =

Substance that reacts to light, becoming acidic

Photoacids are molecules that become more acidic upon absorption of light. Either the light causes a photodissociation to produce a strong acid, or the light causes photoassociation (such as a ring forming reaction) that leads to an increased acidity and dissociation of a proton.

There are two main types of molecules that release protons upon illumination: photoacid generators (PAGs) and photoacids (PAHs). PAGs undergo proton photodissociation irreversibly, while PAHs are molecules that undergo proton photodissociation and thermal reassociation. In this latter case, the excited state is strongly acidic, but reversible.

== Photoacid generators ==
An example due to photodissociation is triphenylsulfonium triflate. This colourless salt consists of a sulfonium cation and the triflate anion. Many related salts are known including those with other noncoordinating anions and those with diverse substituents on the phenyl rings.

The triphenylsulfonium salts absorb at a wavelength of 233 nm, which induces a dissociation of one of the three phenyl rings. This dissociated phenyl radical then re-combines with remaining diphenylsulfonium to liberate an H^{+} ion. The second reaction is irreversible, and therefore the entire process is irreversible, so triphenylsulfonium triflate is a photoacid generator. The ultimate products are thus a neutral organic sulfide and the strong acid triflic acid.

[(C_{6}H_{5})_{3}S^{+}][CF_{3}SO^{−}_{3}] + hν → [(C_{6}H_{5})_{2}S^{+.}][CF_{3}SO^{−}_{3}] + C_{6}H^{.}_{5}
[(C_{6}H_{5})_{2}S^{+.}][CF_{3}SO^{−}_{3}] + C_{6}H^{.}_{5} → (C_{6}H_{5}C_{6}H_{4})(C_{6}H_{5})S + [CF_{3}SO^{−}_{3}][H^{+}]

Applications of these photoacids include photolithography and catalysis of the polymerization of epoxides.

Ortho-nitrobenzylesters are a charge-neutral family of photoacid generators. Upon irradiation, they release sulfonic acids.

== Photoacids ==
An example of a photoacid which undergoes excited-state proton transfer without prior photolysis is the fluorescent dye pyranine (8-hydroxy-1,3,6-pyrenetrisulfonate or HPTS).

The Förster cycle was proposed by Theodor Förster and combines knowledge of the ground state acid dissociation constant (pK_{a}), absorption, and fluorescence spectra to predict the pK_{a} in the excited state of a photoacid.

The name photoacid can be abbreviated PAH, where the H does not stand for a word starting with H, but rather for a proton which is lost when the molecule reacts as a Brønsted acid. This use of PAH should not be confused with other meanings of PAH in chemistry and in medicine.

== Related phenomena ==
Photogenerated bases are a related topic.
