= Carole Berotte Joseph =

Haitian-American college president

President of Bronx Community College
- In office 2011–2014

President of Massachusetts Bay Community College
- In office 2005–2011

Personal details
- Born: Port-au-Prince, Haiti

Dr. Carole Berotte Joseph (born abt. 1949) is a former educator and administrator who served as the first Haitian-born United States college president and the first woman president of Massachusetts Bay Community College.

== Early life and education ==
Joseph was born in Port-au-Prince, Haiti. She was the daughter of Leonce and Nadia Barotte. Joseph migrated to the U.S. at the age of 8 in 1957 and was raised in Brooklyn, New York.

Joseph obtained a bachelor's degree in Spanish and education from the York College, City University of New York (CUNY). She earned her master's degree in curriculum, teaching and bilingual education at Fordham University and her Doctor of Philosophy in bilingual education and sociolinguistics at New York University in 1992.

== Career ==
Joseph was the dean of academic affairs at Dutchess Community College until 2005. At Dutchess, she led the introduction of four year degrees.

She was appointed president of Massachusetts Bay Community College on 1 March 2005. She initiated a five-year plan to address deficiencies identified by accreditation bodies. In October 2007, the faculty at the college passed a non-binding vote of no confidence against Joseph. At least one critic called Joseph's first three years at Mass Bay a “reign of terror," according to the professional journal Inside Higher Ed, after the provost quit and Joseph required six deans to reapply for their jobs. In 2008, she was also criticised for significantly increasing the college's marketing budget. Joseph served at Mass Bay until 2011. In that time, enrolment and minority graduation at the school increased.

In 2011, Joseph was chosen to be president of Bronx Community College in New York. She served as president from 2011 to 2014. In 2012, she succeeded in obtaining national historical landmark status for 5 areas of the community college. When she left in 2014, the chancellor of the City University of New York moved a resolution to thank her for 30 years' service. Joseph left with plans to take up a professorship.

== Personal life ==
Joseph has two daughters. She is fluent in four languages: English, Haitian Creole, Spanish and French.
