= CUNY Aviation Institute =

US research institute

Coordinates: 40.70229°N 73.79601°W

The CUNY Aviation Institute (AI) at York College, City University of New York (CUNY), United States, was established in 2003 by a grant from the Port Authority of New York and New Jersey to promote education and research for the aviation industry. The institute's headquarters is in Jamaica, Queens.

== Purpose ==
In cooperation with local, national, and international partners, the institute aims to develop and disseminate instructional materials relevant to airlines, airports, aviation service providers, civil aviation authorities and related industries. AI aims to continuously develop quality programs of study at all academic levels, including credit and non-credit courses.

== Partnerships ==
- Port Authority of New York and New Jersey: On April 30, 1921, the Port of New York Authority was established as the first of its kind in the Western Hemisphere and the first interstate agency created under a constitutional clause permitting compacts between the states.
- University Transportation Centers Program: The Region 2 University Transportation Research Center is one of ten national centers established in 1987 by the United States Department of Transportation.
- CUNY Institute for Urban Systems: Transportation, water, energy and communication are infrastructure systems which have supported New York City's position as a center for business, media, and the arts.

== See also ==
- Lufthansa Aviation Training
