= William Divale =

William Tulio Divale was a professor of anthropology at York College, City University of New York in Jamaica, New York, USA. He died in 2020 at the age of 78.

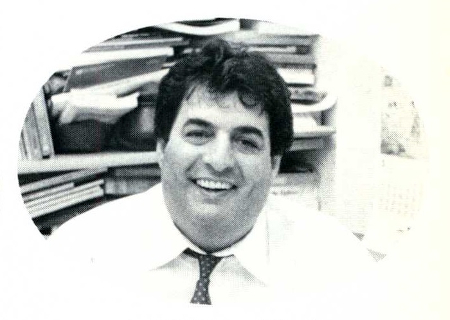
William Divale circa 1984

Divale was a past chairman of the Social Sciences Department. He received his PhD degree from the University at Buffalo in 1974. He is the publisher of the World Cultures eJournal.

He has received two medals for one of his specialties, cross-cultural studies. He was also Past President of the Society for Cross-Cultural Research (2000) and is the current president again (2009).

He also co-authored the book (with James Joseph) I Lived Inside The Campus Revolution (New York: Cowles Book Co, 1970), and authored Matrilocal Residence In Pre-Literate Societies (Ann Arbor: UMI Research Press, 1984). He has also authored over 25 publications in scientific journals.

He has conducted fieldwork in La Gomera, Canary Islands (1973–76), and in the Republic of Moldova (Eastern Europe) (2005–Present).

Divale admitted to being a government spy and informant. The known account of this is disclosed in his book I Lived Inside the Campus Revolution.
