= Mandë Holford =

American chemist

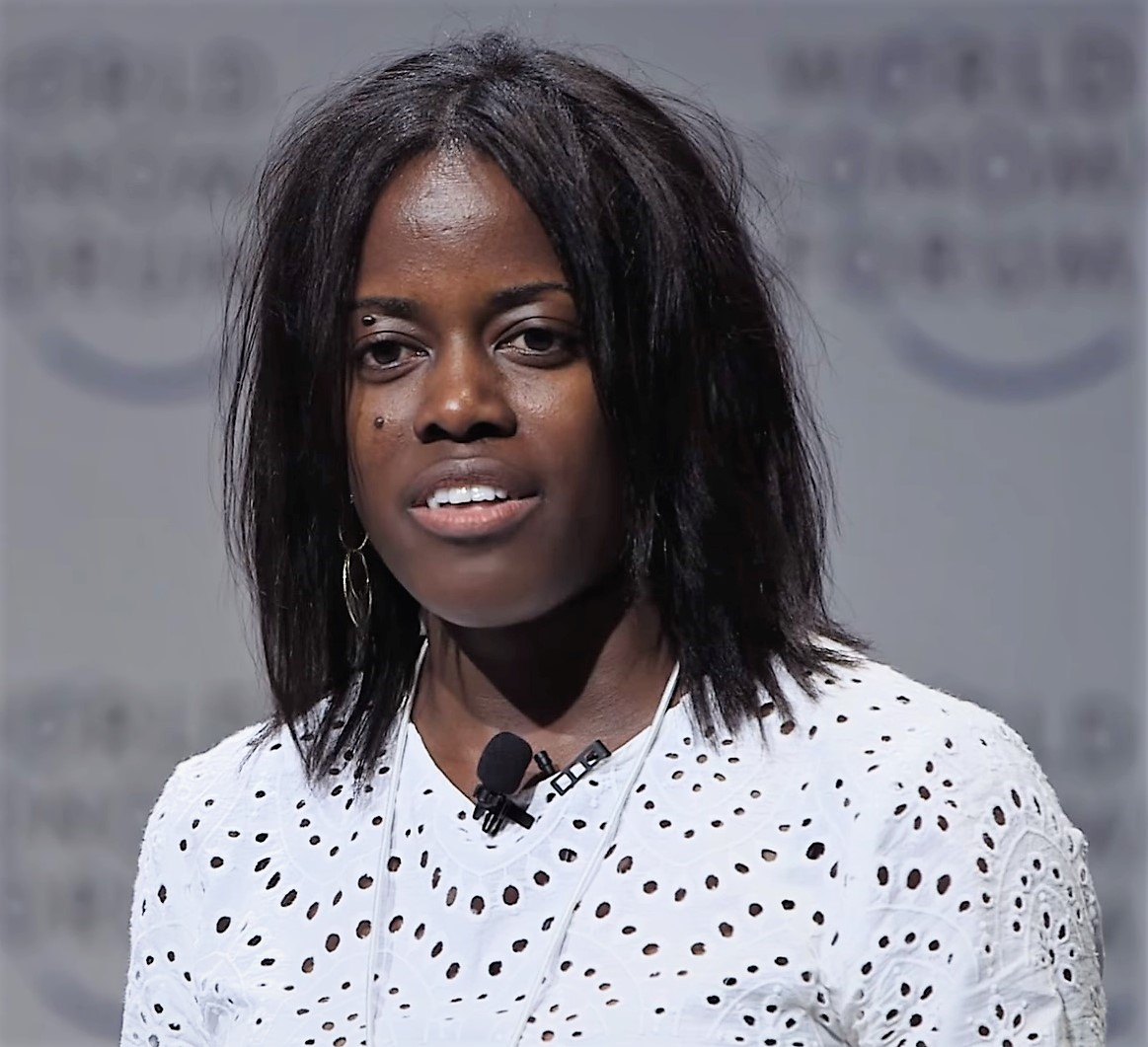
- Holford in 2015
- Born: New York City, US
- Education: York College, City University of New York; The Rockefeller University
- Scientific career
- Fields: Biochemistry; Drug discovery; Science diplomacy
- Workplaces: Harvard University; Hunter College; American Museum of Natural History; Weill Cornell Medical College
- Thesis: Site-Specific Incorporation of Biochemical and Biophysical Probes into Proteins Using Expressed Protein Ligation (2002)
- Doctoral advisor: Tom Muir
- Website: holfordlab.com

Mandë Holford is Professor of Organismic and Evolutionary Biology at Harvard University and Curator of Malacology in Harvard's Museum of Comparative Zoology. She was formerly a professor in chemistry at Hunter College with scientific appointments at the American Museum of Natural History and Weill Cornell Medical College. Her interdisciplinary research covering 'mollusks to medicine' spans chemistry and biology and aims to discover, characterize, and deliver novel peptides from venomous marine snails as tools for manipulating cellular physiology in pain and cancer.

== Education and career ==
Holford received her BS in mathematics and chemistry from York College, City University of New York and her PhD in Synthetic Protein Chemistry from The Rockefeller University. She did her postdoctoral research at The University of Utah in the lab of Baldomero Olivera. She was also a Science & Technology Policy Fellow through the American Association for the Advancement of Science. During her fellowship she worked under Kerri-Ann Jones in the National Science Foundation's Office of International Science and Engineering.

== Research ==
Holford summarizes her research interests as moving "from mollusks to medicine" for drug discovery and delivery. She and her research team extract peptides from venomous snails to identify possible treatments for pain and cancer. Her work takes an interdisciplinary approach, leveraging biochemistry, genomics, proteomics, evolution, and cell biology to isolate, identify, and characterize novel venomous peptides and devise drug delivery strategies. Research projects in her lab takes advantage of inventive tools from chemistry and biology to: (1) investigate the evolution of venom in predatory marine snails, (2) discover disulfide-rich peptides from a venom source, (3) develop high-throughput methods for characterizing structure-function peptide interactions, and (4) deliver novel peptides to their site of action for therapeutic application.

== Science diplomacy ==
Holford was first trained in science diplomacy as an AAAS Science & Technology Policy fellow at the National Science Foundation. Since that time, she has worked on several projects and initiatives to encourage early career scientists to think globally about their research impacts. These efforts include the Hurford Science Diplomacy Initiative, which is a six-week long program taught at The Rockefeller University by Jesse H. Ausubel, Rod Nichols, and Dr. Holford. She has also worked with the AAAS Center for Science Diplomacy on their programs to train scientists for global leadership and advocacy.

Her writing on the importance of training young scientists to leverage their expertise to build global connections has been featured in the World Science Forum and Scientific American. She has also written about the role scientists played in re-establishing connections with Cuba in 2015 for Science magazine.

Holford is a life member of the Council on Foreign Relations.

== Public engagement ==
Holford is actively involved in science education and is the co-founder of KillerSnails.com, a learning games company supported by the National Science Foundation and the Small Business Innovation Research Fund. They have produced games like Killer Snails: Assassins of the Sea and Biome Builder, which won the International Serious Play Gold Medal. She has also appeared on The Moth, Science Friday, NBC Learn (where she was named a 21st Century Chemist in the NBC Learn Chemistry Now series), and You're the Expert, speaking about her research expertise and her experiences as a scientist. Holford and her lab have also participated in a NYC based program led by the non-profit organization Ligo Project called Art of Science where her and her lab collaborated with NYC based artist Jackie Lima to create new works that explore the exchange between two seemingly disparate disciplines and seeks to provide new and unique perspectives on science to the NYC community.

== Awards and honors ==
- NSF CAREER Award, 2012
- The New Champion Young Scientist Award, World Economic Forum, 2014
- Camille Dreyfus Teacher-Scholar Award, 2013
- Wings Worldquest Humanity Award, 2019
- NIH Director's Pioneer Award, 2023
