= Photodissociation =

Chemical reaction in which a compound is broken down by light

Photodissociation, photolysis, photodecomposition, or photofragmentation is a chemical reaction in which molecules of a chemical compound are broken down by absorption of light (photons). It is defined as the interaction of one or more photons with one target molecule that dissociates into two fragments.

Here, “light” is broadly defined as radiation spanning the vacuum ultraviolet (VUV), ultraviolet (UV), visible, and infrared (IR) regions of the electromagnetic spectrum. To break covalent bonds, photon energies corresponding to visible, UV, or VUV light are typically required, whereas IR photons may be sufficiently energetic to detach ligands from coordination complexes or to fragment supramolecular complexes.

== Photoinduced proton transfer ==
Photoacids are molecules that upon light absorption undergo a proton transfer to form the photobase.

$$\ce{AH ->[h\nu] A^- + H^+}$$

In these reactions, the dissociation occurs in the electronically excited state. After proton transfer and relaxation to the electronic ground state, the proton and acid recombine to form the photoacid again.

Photoacids are a convenient source to induce pH jumps in ultrafast laser spectroscopy experiments.

== Photolysis in the atmosphere ==
Photolysis occurs in the atmosphere as part of a series of reactions by which primary pollutants such as hydrocarbons and nitrogen oxides react to form secondary pollutants such as peroxyacyl nitrates. See Photochemical smog.

The two most important photodissociation reactions in the troposphere are firstly:

$$\ce{O3} + h\nu \longrightarrow \ce{O2 + O(^1D)} \quad \lambda < 320 \text{ nm}$$

which generates an excited oxygen atom which can react with water to give the hydroxyl radical:

$$\ce{O(^1D) + H2O -> 2 ^{*} OH}$$

The hydroxyl radical is central to atmospheric chemistry as it initiates the oxidation of hydrocarbons in the atmosphere and so acts as a detergent.

Secondly the reaction:

$$\ce{NO2} + h\nu \longrightarrow \ce{NO + O}$$

is a key reaction in the formation of tropospheric ozone.

The formation of the ozone layer is also caused by photodissociation. Ozone in the Earth's stratosphere is created by ultraviolet light striking oxygen molecules containing two oxygen atoms (O_{2}), splitting them into individual oxygen atoms (atomic oxygen). The atomic oxygen then combines with unbroken O_{2} to create ozone, O_{3}. In addition, photolysis is the process by which CFCs are broken down in the upper atmosphere to form ozone-destroying chlorine free radicals.

== Astrophysics ==
In astrophysics, photodissociation is one of the major processes through which molecules are broken down (but new molecules are being formed). Because of the vacuum of the interstellar medium, molecules and free radicals can exist for a long time. Photodissociation is the main path by which molecules are broken down. Photodissociation rates are important in the study of the composition of interstellar clouds in which stars are formed.

Examples of photodissociation in the interstellar medium are (hν is the energy of a single photon of frequency ν):

$$\ce{H2O ->[h\nu] H + OH}$$
$$\ce{CH4 ->[h\nu] CH3 + H}$$

== Atmospheric gamma-ray bursts ==
Currently, orbiting satellites detect an average of about one gamma-ray burst (GRB) per day. Because gamma-ray bursts are visible to distances encompassing most of the observable universe, a volume encompassing many billions of galaxies, this suggests that gamma-ray bursts must be exceedingly rare events per galaxy.

Measuring the exact rate of gamma-ray bursts is difficult, but for a galaxy of approximately the same size as the Milky Way, the expected rate (for long GRBs) is about one burst every 100,000 to 1,000,000 years. Only a few percent of these would be beamed toward Earth. Estimates of rates of short GRBs are even more uncertain because of the unknown beaming fraction, but are probably comparable.

A gamma-ray burst in the Milky Way, if close enough to Earth and beamed toward it, could have significant effects on the biosphere. The absorption of radiation in the atmosphere would cause photodissociation of nitrogen, generating nitric oxide that would act as a catalyst to destroy ozone.

The atmospheric photodissociation

- $\ce{N2 -> 2N}$
- $\ce{O2 -> 2O}$
- $\ce{CO2 -> C + 2O}$
- $\ce{H2O -> 2H + O}$
- $\ce{2NH3 -> 3H2 + N2}$

would yield

- NO_{2} (consumes up to 400 ozone molecules)
- CH_{2} (nominal)
- CH_{4} (nominal)
- CO_{2}

(incomplete)

According to a 2004 study, a GRB at a distance of about a kiloparsec could destroy up to half of Earth's ozone layer; the direct UV irradiation from the burst combined with additional solar UV radiation passing through the diminished ozone layer could then have potentially significant impacts on the food chain and potentially trigger a mass extinction. The authors estimate that one such burst is expected per billion years, and hypothesize that the Ordovician-Silurian extinction event could have been the result of such a burst.

There are strong indications that long gamma-ray bursts preferentially or exclusively occur in regions of low metallicity. Because the Milky Way has been metal-rich since before the Earth formed, this effect may diminish or even eliminate the possibility that a long gamma-ray burst has occurred within the Milky Way within the past billion years. No such metallicity biases are known for short gamma-ray bursts. Thus, depending on their local rate and beaming properties, the possibility for a nearby event to have had a large impact on Earth at some point in geological time may still be significant.

== Multiple-photon dissociation ==
Single photons in the infrared spectral range usually are not energetic enough for direct photodissociation of molecules. However, after absorption of multiple infrared photons a molecule may gain internal energy to overcome its barrier for dissociation. Multiple-photon dissociation (MPD; [[infrared multi-photons dissociation|IRMPD]] with infrared radiation) can be achieved by applying high-power lasers, e.g. a carbon dioxide laser, or a free-electron laser, or by long interaction times of the molecule with the radiation field without the possibility for rapid cooling, e.g. by collisions. The latter method allows even for MPD induced by black-body radiation, a technique called blackbody infrared radiative dissociation (BIRD).

== See also ==
- Flash photolysis
- Photocatalysis
- Photochemistry
- Photohydrogen
- Quantum coherence in photosynthesis
