= Theodor Förster =

German physical chemist (1910–1974)

- Born: 15 May 1910; Frankfurt am Main, Germany
- Died: 20 May 1974 (aged 64); Stuttgart, Germany
- Education: University of Frankfurt
- Known for: Förster resonance energy transfer Förster cycle Förster coupling
- Scientific career
- Institutions: Leipzig University; Poznań University; Max Planck Institute; University of Stuttgart
- Thesis: Zur Polarisation von Elektronen durch Reflexion (1933)
- Doctoral advisor: Erwin Madelung
- Other academic advisors: Karl-Friedrich Bonhoeffer
- Notable students: Hermann Schmalzried

Theodor Förster (15 May 1910 – 20 May 1974) was a German physical chemist known for theoretical work on light–matter interaction in molecular systems such as fluorescence and resonant energy transfer.

== Education and career ==
Förster was born in Frankfurt am Main and studied physics and mathematics at the University of Frankfurt from 1929 to 1933. He received his Ph.D. at the age of only 23 under Erwin Madelung in 1933. In the same year he joined the Nazi Party and the SA. He then joined Karl-Friedrich Bonhoeffer as a research assistant at the Leipzig University, where he worked closely with Peter Debye, Werner Heisenberg, and Hans Kautzky. Förster obtained his habilitation in 1940 and became a lecturer at the Leipzig University. Following his research and teaching activities in Leipzig, he became a professor at the Poznań University in occupied Poland (1942).

From 1947 to 1951 he worked at the Max Planck Institute for Physical Chemistry in Göttingen as a department head. In 1951, he became a professor at the University of Stuttgart. He died due to a heart attack in 1974.

== Research ==
Among Förster's greatest achievements is his contribution to the understanding of FRET (Förster resonance energy transfer). The term Förster radius, which is related to the FRET phenomenon, is named after him. He also proposed the Förster cycle to predict the acid dissociation constant of a photoacid. He also discovered excimer formation in solutions of pyrene.

== Work ==
=== Book ===
- Förster, Theodor: Fluoreszenz organischer Verbindungen. Göttingen: Vandenhoeck & Ruprecht, 1950. – Unveränd. Nachdr. d. 1. Aufl., im Literaturverz. erg. um spätere Veröff. d. Autors. Göttingen: Vandenhoeck & Ruprecht, 1982 – ISBN 3-525-42312-8*

=== Papers ===
- Förster, Theodor (1949-05-01). "Experimentelle und theoretische Untersuchung des zwischenmolekularen Übergangs von Elektronenanregungsenergie". Zeitschrift für Naturforschung A. 4 (5): 321–327. Bibcode:1949ZNatA...4..321F. doi:10.1515/zna-1949-0501. ISSN 1865-7109. S2CID 102175097.
- Förster, Theodor (1975), "Excimers and Exciplexes", The Exciplex, Elsevier, pp. 1–21, doi:10.1016/b978-0-12-290650-3.50007-5, ISBN 978-0-12-290650-3

== Literature ==
- A. Weller: Nachruf auf Theodor Förster. In: Berichte der Bunsengesellschaft für Physikalische Chemie 78 (1974) p. 969 [with Porträt].
- George Porter: Some reflections on the work of Theodor Förster. In: Die Naturwissenschaften 63 (1976) 5, p. 207–211.
