= Reatha Clark King =

American chemist and businessperson

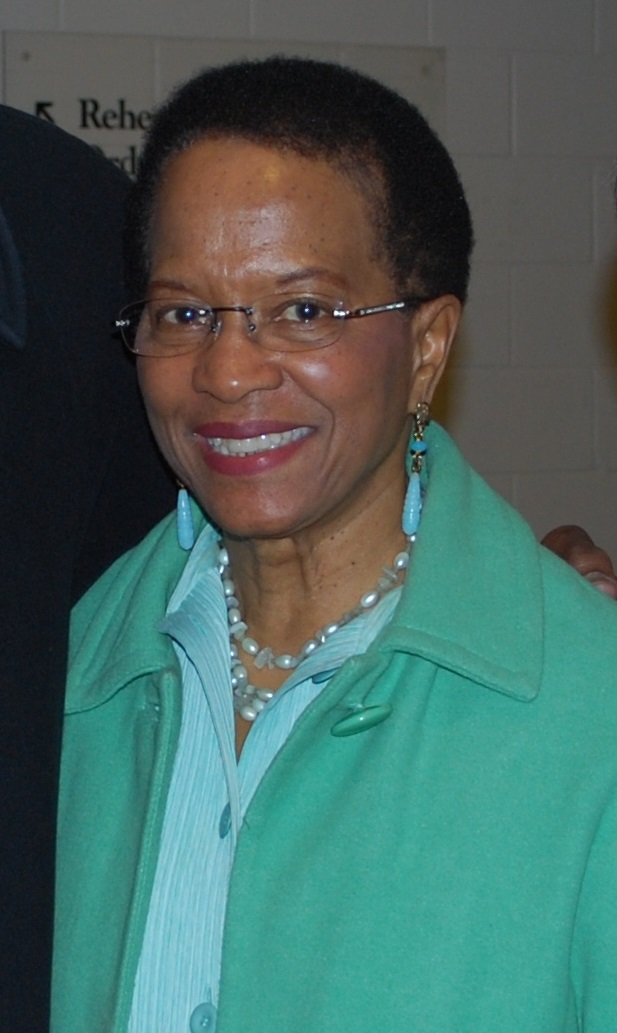
- Born: Reatha Belle Clark; April 11, 1938 (age 88); Pavo, Georgia
- Education: Clark College; University of Chicago
- Occupations: chemist and businesswoman
- Employer: General Mills, Inc.

Reatha Belle Clark King (born April 11, 1938) is an American chemist, the former vice president of the General Mills Corporation; and the former president, executive director, and chairman of the board of trustees of the General Mills Foundation, the philanthropic foundation of General Mills, Inc.

== Early life and education ==
Reatha Belle Clark was born in Pavo, Georgia, United States on April 11, 1938. Her father, Willie B. Clark, was a sharecropper, and her mother, Ola Mae Watts Campbell, had only a third-grade education.

Reatha Clark began elementary school in a one-room school for grades 1–7, at Mt. Zion Baptist, a colored church, where she was taught by Florence Frazier. Later, she attended school in Coolidge, Georgia, and high school in Moultrie, Georgia. When she graduated from Moultrie High School for Negro Youth in 1954, the same year that Brown v. Board of Education determined segregated schools were illegal, Clark was the valedictorian of her class.

Clark was recruited to attend Clark College in Atlanta, where she initially enrolled as a home economics major. She was encouraged to become a research chemist by the head of the chemistry department there, Alfred Spriggs. King earned a bachelor of science degree in chemistry and mathematics from Clark College.

Spriggs encouraged her to apply for a fellowship from the Woodrow Wilson National Fellowship Foundation, which she received from 1958 to 1960. The fellowship supported her work at the University of Chicago, from which she obtained a master of science degree in chemistry in 1960. She went on to study with advisor Ole J. Kleppa, receiving her Ph.D. degree in thermochemistry from the University of Chicago in 1963. The title of her Ph.D. thesis was "Contributions to the thermochemistry of the Laves phases." While in Chicago she also met and married N. Judge King.

Reatha Clark King later earned a master's in business administration in finance management from Columbia University while on sabbatical.

== Scientific and academic career ==
King was employed for five years (1963–1968) as a research chemist for the National Bureau of Standards in Washington, D.C. Hired by George T. Armstrong, King was the first African American female chemist to work at the agency. She used techniques for both bomb and flame calorimetry. Much of her work there involved measuring the accurate heats of formation of gaseous fluorine compounds, and she received a Meritorious Publication Award for her paper on fluoride flame calorimetry. This research was important to the NASA space program. Her two children were born during this time. Techniques and mechanisms that she developed for flame fluorine calorimetry are still used.

King and her family moved to New York when her husband accepted a position at Nassau Community College, Garden City, New York. King obtained an assistant professorship at York College, City University of New York. There she served as professor of chemistry, 1968–1977, associate dean for Division of Natural Science & Mathematics, 1970-1974, and associate dean for academic affairs, 1974–1977.

She moved to Minneapolis–Saint Paul, Minnesota, to become president of Metropolitan State University, where she worked from 1977 to 1988. She helped to substantially expand the university, and promoted involvement of minorities and women in higher education. Her husband joined the Minnesota Mining and Manufacturing Company (3M) as a research chemist.

== Business career ==
In 1988, King was recruited by General Mills in Minneapolis, Minnesota, to serve in two roles. She became vice president of the General Mills Corporation and president and executive director of the General Mills Foundation. She remained in these positions from 1988 to 2002. In 2002, she was elected as chairman of the board of trustees of General Mills Foundation, and served in this position for a further year, retiring completely from General Mills in 2003. Under her leadership the General Mills Foundation, originally established in 1954, has been active both locally and nationally in philanthropic and community service.

King has served on the boards of a number of other corporations, including ExxonMobil, Wells Fargo & Company; Department 56; Minnesota Mutual Companies; and the H. B. Fuller Company. In 1994, she was appointed by President Bill Clinton to be a member of the Board of Directors of the Corporation for National and Community Service, and served until her resignation in 1997. She has also served with nonprofits, such as the International Trachoma Initiative, Allina Health, the Council on Foundations, the National Association of Corporate Directors, and the Congressional Black Caucus Foundation.

She has served as a trustee with Clark Atlanta University, and is a Life Trustee for the University of Chicago. She is a member of the American Council on Education and the Executive Leadership Council in Washington, D.C. She has a particularly strong interest in education, and has stated: "I realized early in life that education is our best enabling resource, that technical skills are important, and that my stamina for championing educational opportunity for all people is inexhaustible."

== Publications ==
- King, R.C; Kleppa, O.J (January 1964). "A thermochemical study of some selected laves phases". Acta Metallurgica. 12 (1): 87–97. doi:10.1016/0001-6160(64)90056-2.
- King, R. C. and Armstrong, G. T. (1964). Heat of combustion and heat of formation of aluminum carbide. Journal of Research of the National Bureau of Standards (A. Physics and Chemistry), 68A(6), pp. 661–668.
- King, R. C. and Armstrong, G. T. (1965). Heat of formation of aluminum carbide. Technical News Bulletin, 49(2), pp. 26–27. (Photo on cover of issue.)
- King, R. C., and Armstrong, G. T., Chapter 8: Fluorine Flame Calorimetry. II. The heats of reaction of oxygen difluoride, fluorine and oxygen, with hydrogen. The heat of formation of oxygen difluoride. In National Bureau of Standards (1 January 1967) NBS Report 9500: Preliminary report on the thermodynamic properties of selected light-element and some related compounds. U.S. Air Force Order No. OAR ISSA 65-8.
- King, R. C., and Armstrong, G. T. (May 1967) Interagency Chemical Rocket Propellant Group, Thermochemistry Working Croup, Bulletin of the Fifth Meeting March 15–17, 1967, Vol. 1., Chemical Propulsion Information Agency. Publications CPIA 146, pp 69–96.
- King, Reatha C., and Armstrong, George T. (1968) "Constant Pressure Flame Calorimetry With Fluorine II. The Heat of Formation of Oxygen Difluoride." Journal of Research of the National Bureau of Standards (A. Physics and Chemistry), 72A (2), pp. 113–131. Received Meritorious Publication Award, 1969.
- Armstrong, G. T., and King, R. C. (1969). The heats of formation of some fluorine-containing oxidizers, Proc. Conf. Interagency Chemical Rocket Propulsion Group, Thermochemistry Working Group, Cleveland OH, April 9–11, 1969, 7th Meeting, Bulletin 1, pp. 19–40. (Chemical Propulsion Information Agency. Johns Hopkins University, Applied Physics Laboratory, Silver Spring. Md.. Aug. 1969).
- King, R. C., and Armstrong, G. T. (1970) "Fluorine Flame Calorimetry. III. The Heat of Formation of Chlorine Trifluoride at 298.15 K". Journal of Research of the National Bureau of Standards (A. Physics and Chemistry), 74A (6), pp. 769–779.
- Armstrong, George T.; King, Reatha Clark (1979). "Chapter 15: Fluorine Flame Calorimetry". In Sunner, Stig; Mansson, Margret (eds.). Combustion calorimetry. Oxford: Pergamon. pp. 333–359. ISBN 9781483280899.
- King, Reatha Clark (April 1, 1999). "Succeeding Against the Odds in Higher Education: Advancing Society by Overcoming Obstacles Due to Race and Gender". In Harvey, William B. (ed.). Grass roots and glass ceilings : African American administrators in predominantly white colleges and universities. Albany, NY: State University of New York Press. pp. 1–38. ISBN 978-0791441640.

== Awards and honors ==
King has received honorary degrees and many other awards, including:

- The Governor's Civil Rights Legend Award, 2019.
- International Citizen Award, 2013, from the International Leadership Institute (ILI), Minneapolis, MN.
- Louis W. Hill, Jr. Fellow in Philanthropy at the Hubert H. Humphrey Center of the University of Minnesota, 2004.
- Director of the Year from the National Association of Corporate Directors, 2004.
- One of Ebony magazine's Top 50 Black Executives in Corporate America, 1992.
- Exceptional Black Scientist Award from CIBA-GEIGY Corporation, 1984.
- Defender of Democracy Award from the Washington, D.C. Martin Luther King, Jr. National Memorial Project Foundation.
- Delta Sigma Theta sorority, Minneapolis-St. Paul Alumnae Chapter, 1979.
