= S-Methylmethionine =

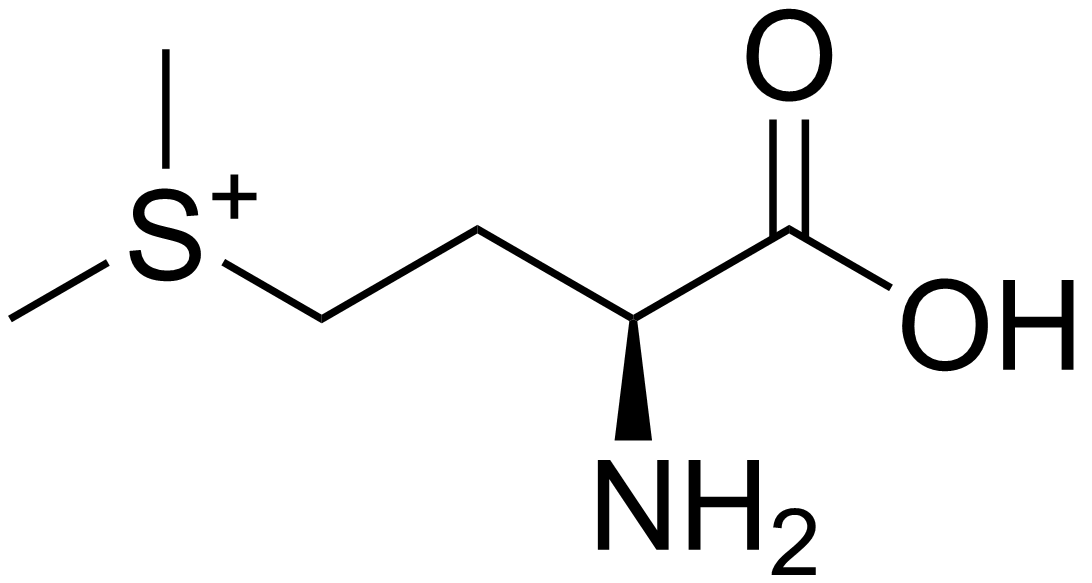

Names
- IUPAC name [(3S)-3-Amino-3-carboxypropyl](dimethyl)sulfonium
- Other names S-Methyl-L-methionine; Vitamin U

Identifiers
CAS Number	4727-40-6
3D model (JSmol)	Interactive image
ChEBI	CHEBI:17728
ChemSpider	128519
KEGG	C03172
PubChem CID	145692
UNII	3485Y39925
CompTox Dashboard (EPA)	DTXSID00859813
- InChI: InChI=1S/C6H13NO2S/c1-10(2)4-3-5(7)6(8)9/h5H,3-4,7H2,1-2H3/p+1/t5-/m0/s1 Key: YDBYJHTYSHBBAU-YFKPBYRVSA-O; InChI=1/C6H13NO2S/c1-10(2)4-3-5(7)6(8)9/h5H,3-4,7H2,1-2H3/p+1/t5-/m0/s1 Key: YDBYJHTYSHBBAU-YJIVXYNWBY
- SMILES: C[S+](C)CC[C@@H](C(=O)O)N

Properties
Chemical formula	C_{6}H_{14}NO_{2}S^{+}
Molar mass	164.243 g/mol
Melting point	139 °C (282 °F; 412 K) (bromide salt, decomposes); 134 °C (273 °F) (chloride salt, decomposes)

Hazards
- Lethal dose or concentration (LD, LC)
LD_{50} (median dose)	2760 mg/kg (iv, mice, chloride salt)
- Except where otherwise noted, data are given for materials in their standard state (at 25 °C [77 °F], 100 kPa). verify (what is ?) Infobox references

S-Methylmethionine (SMM) is a derivative of methionine with the chemical formula (CH_{3})_{2}S^{+}CH_{2}CH_{2}CH(NH_{3}^{+})CO_{2}^{−}. This cation is a naturally-occurring intermediate in many biosynthetic pathways owing to the sulfonium functional group. It is biosynthesized from L-methionine and S-adenosylmethionine by the enzyme methionine S-methyltransferase. S-methylmethionine is particularly abundant in plants, being more abundant than methionine.

S-Methylmethionine is sometimes referred to as vitamin U, but it is not considered a true vitamin. The term was coined in 1950 by Garnett Cheney for uncharacterized anti-ulcerogenic factors in raw cabbage juice that may help speed healing of peptic ulcers.

== Biosynthesis and biochemical function ==
S-Methylmethionine arises via the methylation of methionine by S-adenosyl methionine (SAM). The coproduct is S-adenosyl homocysteine.

The biological roles of S-methylmethionine are not well understood. Speculated roles include methionine storage, use as a methyl donor, regulation of SAM. A few plants use S-methylmethionine as a precursor to the osmolyte dimethylsulfoniopropionate (DMSP). Intermediates include dimethylsulfoniumpropylamine and dimethylsulfoniumpropionaldehyde.

== Beer flavor precursor in barley malt ==
S-Methylmethionine is found in barley and is further created during the malting process. SMM can be subsequently converted to dimethyl sulfide (DMS) during the malt kilning process, causing an undesirable flavor. Lightly kilned malts such as pilsner or lager malts retain much of their SMM content while higher kilned malt such as pale ale malt has substantially more of the SMM converted to DMS in the malt. Darker kilned malts such as Munich malt have virtually no SMM content since most has been converted to DMS. Other crystal malts and roasted malts have no SMM content and often no DMS content since the kilning also drives that compound out of the malt.
