= Sulfonium =

Cation of the form [SR3]+

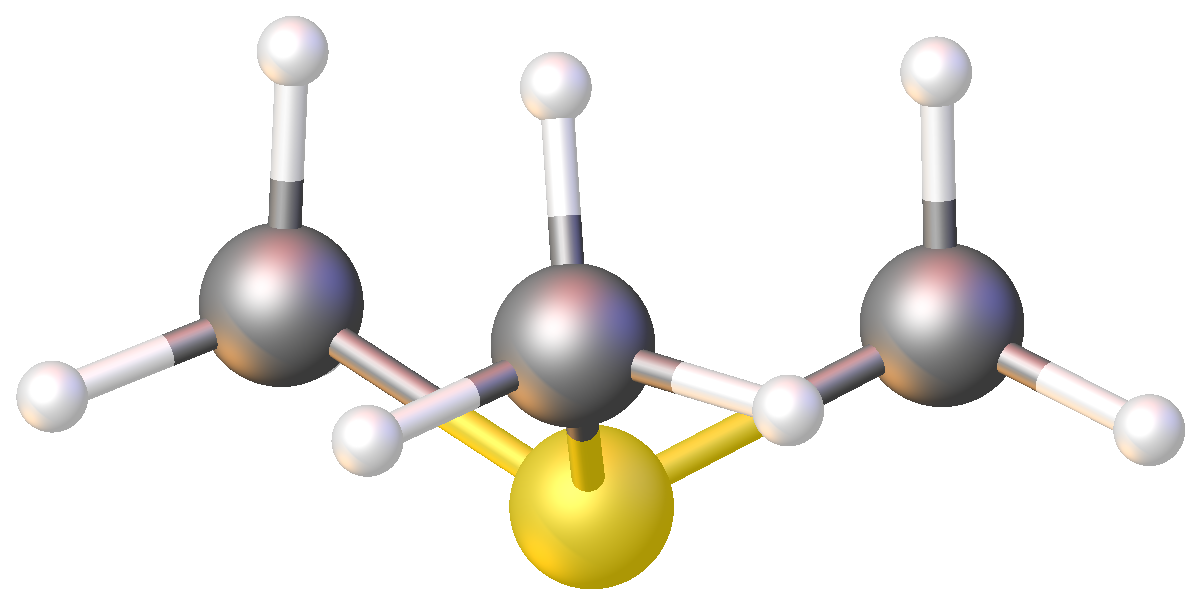
Structure of (CH_{3})_{3}S^{+}. The C-S-C angles are 102° and C-S bond distance is 177 picometers.

In organic chemistry, a sulfonium ion, also known as sulphonium ion or sulfanium ion, is a positively charged ion (a "cation") featuring three organic substituents attached to sulfur. These organosulfur compounds have the formula [SR_{3}]^{+}. Together with a negatively charged counterion, they give sulfonium salts. They are typically colorless solids that are soluble in polar organic solvent.

== Synthesis ==
Dimethylsulfoniopropionate (DMSP), is found in marine phytoplankton and seaweeds.

Sulfonium compounds are usually synthesized by the reaction of thioethers with alkyl halides. For example, the reaction of dimethyl sulfide with iodomethane yields trimethylsulfonium iodide:

CH_{3}SCH_{3} + CH_{3}I → (CH_{3})_{3}S^{+}I^{−}

The reaction proceeds by a nucleophilic substitution mechanism (S_{N}2), where iodide is the leaving group. For weakly electrophilic alkyl halides, the reactions can be accelerated by the addition of silver tetrafluoroborate. In that vein, the rate (and irreversibility) of methylation improves with more electrophilic methylating agents such as methyl trifluoromethanesulfonate.

These S-alkylations can be reversible, especially when the leaving group is iodide. For example, alkylation of dimethylsulfide with allyl iodide gives trimethylsulfonium iodide (and, presumably, allyl methyl sulfide). In a related process, secondary alkyl halides react with dimethylsulfide to give mixed thioether, eliminating methyl halide.

Below are listed some other synthetic methods, among many:

- sulfonium salts can be made by treating secondary and tertiary alcohols with sulfuric acid in the presence of thioethers.
- addition of methyl iodide to dimethyldisulfide in the presence of a mercuric halide catalyst.
- addition of sulfenyl chlorides to alkenes, giving episulfonium salts.
- alkylation of thioethers with electrophilic alkenes in the presence of a proton donor.
- reaction of methyl chloroformate and dimethyl sulfide, evolving carbon dioxide

== Inversion ==
Sulfonium ions with three different substituents are chiral owing to their pyramidal structure. Unlike the isoelectronic oxonium ions (R_{3}O^{+}), chiral sulfonium ions are resolvable into optically stable enantiomers. [Me(Et)SCH_{2}CO_{2}H]^{+} is the first chiral sulfonium cation to be resolved into enantiomers. The barrier to inversion ranges from 100 to 130 kJ/mol.

== Applications and occurrence ==
=== Biochemistry ===
The sulfonium (more specifically methioninium) species S-adenosylmethionine occurs widely in nature, where it is used as a source of the adenosoyl or methyl radicals. These radicals participate in the biosynthesis of many compounds.

Structure of S-adenosylmethionine.

Other naturally occurring sulfonium species are S-methylmethionine (methioninium) and the related dimethylsulfoniopropionate (DMSP).

=== Organic synthesis ===
Sulfonium salts are precursor to sulfur ylides, which are useful in carbon–carbon bond-forming reactions. In a typical application, a R_{2}S^{+}CH_{2}R′ center is deprotonated to give the ylide R_{2}S^{+}CHR^{−}. These ylides add to ketones and aldehydes to give epoxides (Johnson–Corey–Chaykovsky reaction).

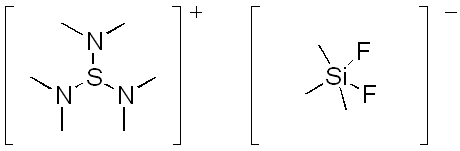
Structure of tris(dimethylamino)sulfonium difluorotrimethylsilicate.

Tris(dimethylamino)sulfonium difluorotrimethylsilicate [((CH_{3})_{2}N)_{3}S]^{+}[F_{2}Si(CH_{3})_{3}]^{−} is a popular fluoridation agent.

Some azo dyes are modified with sulfonium groups to give them a positive charge. The compound triphenylsulfonium triflate is a photoacid, a compound that under light converts to an acid.

Organic sulfides react with liquid bromine to give bromosulfonium bromides, i.e.:

RSR′ + [RR′S^{+}Br]Br^{−}

== See also ==
- Onium compounds
