= Andrew G. Campbell =

American biologist

- Born: Andrew Garrett Campbell
- Education: York College, City University of New York; University of California, Los Angeles
- Scientific career
- Workplaces: Brown University
- Thesis: The isolation and characterization of basement membrane components in Drosophila melanogaster (1987)

Andrew Garrett Campbell is an American biologist who is a professor of Medical Science and Dean of the Graduate School at Brown University. In 2020, he was named by Cell Press as one of the most 100 "inspiring Black scientists in America".

== Early life and education ==
Campbell studied biology at York College, City University of New York, minoring in French, and graduated in 1981. He moved to the West Coast of the United States for his graduate studies in the laboratory of John H. Fessler, where he studied Drosophila melanogaster at the University of California, Los Angeles. As a graduate student in 1986 Campbell partnered with fellow UCLA graduate student Theodore (Ted) B. Thederahn and UCLA graduate Robert B Laukka to serve as founding directors and principals of the Southern California-based research and radiation safety products manufacturing company, Bremshield Corporation whose products supported the U.S. academic biomedical research community and newly emerging biotech industry. Campbell served as a postdoctoral fellow at both UCLA and the University of California, San Francisco. As a postdoctoral Fellow in the laboratory of Dan S. Ray at UCLA, he began his studies of the endonuclease enzyme RNase H. As a President's Postdoctoral Fellow at UCSF Campbell studied Hepatitis B Virus with William J. Rutter, founder of the Chiron Corporation which would go on to develop the Hepatitis B vaccine as the 1st genetically engineered vaccine to receive FDA approval for human use.

== Research and career ==
In 1994, Campbell joined the faculty at Brown University as assistant professor of Medical Science. His research considers infectious microbial diseases in neglected populations and regions. In particular, Campbell continued his studies of the endonuclease enzymes Ribonuclease H (RNases H), with which he hopes to better understand nucleic acid metabolic function. He is also interested in the lifecycle of Trypanosoma brucei, a parasite carried by tsetse flies in sub-Saharan Africa. Campbell is also interested in the role of viral RNase-H as therapeutic targets, and has investigated how mutations in RNase-H can give rise to drug resistance.

Alongside his research, Campbell develops programs to improve the representation of historically underrepresented minority students in science and technology programs. He was promoted to Dean of the Graduate School in 2016. He is the fifteenth person to hold such a position. During his first two years as Graduate School Dean he increased diversity in the graduate student population to historic levels. In 2019, he announced that Brown University would no longer require the Graduate Record Examination (GRE) to apply to 24 of Brown's 51 doctoral programs.

== Awards and honours ==
- 1997 National Science Foundation CAREER Award
- 1998 American Foundations for AIDS Research Investigator Award
- 2010 Brown University Harriet W. Sheridan Center Medal for Distinguished Contributions to Teaching and Learning
- 2015 Brown University Presidential Award for Excellence in Faculty Governance
- 2017 Elected Fellow of the American Society for Cell Biology
- 2020 Elected fellow of the American Association for the Advancement of Science
- 2020 Chair-elect on the Board of Directors of the Council of Graduate Schools
- 2021 Elected to the Council of the American Society for Cell Biology

== Selected publications ==
- Olson, P F; Fessler, L I; Nelson, R E; Sterne, R E; Campbell, A G; Fessler, J H (April 1990). "Glutactin, a novel Drosophila basement membrane-related glycoprotein with sequence similarity to serine esterases". The EMBO Journal. 9 (4): 1219–1227. doi:10.1002/j.1460-2075.1990.tb08229.x. PMC 551798. PMID 2108864.
- Akkina, RK; Rosenblatt, JD; Campbell, AG; Chen, IS; Zack, JA (1 September 1994). "Modeling human lymphoid precursor cell gene therapy in the SCID-hu mouse". Blood. 84 (5): 1393–1398. doi:10.1182/blood.V84.5.1393.1393. PMID 7520766.
- Allen-Ramdial, Stacy-Ann A.; Campbell, Andrew G. (1 July 2014). "Reimagining the Pipeline: Advancing STEM Diversity, Persistence, and Success". BioScience. 64 (7): 612–618. doi:10.1093/biosci/biu076. PMC 4282132. PMID 25561747.
- Estrada, Mica; Burnett, Myra; Campbell, Andrew G.; Campbell, Patricia B.; Denetclaw, Wilfred F.; Gutiérrez, Carlos G.; Hurtado, Sylvia; John, Gilbert H.; Matsui, John; McGee, Richard; Okpodu, Camellia Moses; Robinson, T. Joan; Summers, Michael F.; Werner-Washburne, Maggie; Zavala, MariaElena (1 September 2016). "Improving Underrepresented Minority Student Persistence in STEM". CBE: Life Sciences Education. 15 (3): es5. doi:10.1187/cbe.16-01-0038. PMC 5008901. PMID 27543633.
