= James Como =

American academic (1946–2025)

- Born: James Timothy Como; December 23, 1946; East Harlem, New York, U.S.
- Died: November 24, 2025 (aged 78); Bucharest, Romania
- Children: 2

Academic background
- Education: Queens College, City University of New York (BA, MA); Fordham University (MA); Columbia University (MPhil, PhD)

Academic work
- Discipline: Communication studies
- Sub-discipline: Rhetoric; Literature; Christian apologetics
- Institutions: York College, City University of New York

James Timothy Como (December 23, 1946 – November 24, 2025) was an American academic and writer who was professor emeritus of rhetoric and public communication at York College, City University of New York.

== Early life and education ==
Como was born in East Harlem and attended Long Island City High School, graduating two years early. He earned a Bachelor of Arts degree in English literature and a Master of Arts in communications from Queens College, City University of New York; a Master of Arts in Medieval English literature from Fordham University; and a Master of Philosophy and PhD from Columbia University.

== Career ==
Como joined the faculty at York College, City University of New York, in Jamaica, Queens, in 1968, where he founded the speech communication discipline and was also chairman and professor in the Department of Performing and Fine Arts.

Como published in National Review, The New Criterion, and in The Wilson Quarterly, among other venues, on subjects including C. S. Lewis, rhetorical theory, literature, Christianity, and the culture of Latin America. In addition to his books on C. S. Lewis, he published another seven books that are collections of essays, short stories, poems, a folk novel for children, and a summary of communication concepts and techniques emphasizing conversation.

A founding member of the New York C. S. Lewis Society (1969), Como served as an advisor and board member of a number of organizations and journals, both before and after his retirement.

== Personal life ==
Como died from heart failure in Bucharest, Romania, on November 24, 2025, after having given one of the keynote addresses at the "C. S. Lewis and Kindred Spirits" conference in Iași. He was 78.

== Books about C. S. Lewis ==
- James Como, C. S. Lewis at the Breakfast Table and Other Reminiscences. New edition, Harcourt Brace Jovanovich, 1992. ISBN 0-15-623207-3
- James Como, Branches to Heaven: The Geniuses of C. S. Lewis, Spence, 1998. ISBN 978-1890626013
- James Como, Remembering C. S. Lewis (3rd ed. of C. S. Lewis at the Breakfast Table), Ignatius, 2006. ISBN 1586171089
- James Como, Why I Believe in Narnia: 33 Reviews & Essays on the Life & Works of C.S. Lewis, Winged Lion Press, 2008. ISBN 978-0972322188
- James Como, C. S. Lewis: A Very Short Introduction, Oxford University Press, 2019. ISBN 978-0198828242
- James Como, Mystical Perelandra: My Lifelong Reading of C.S. Lewis and His Favorite Book, Winged Lion Press, 2022. ISBN 978-1935688297

== Other publications ==
- James T. Como, ed., Speech 101, 2nd custom ed. for York College, Pearson Custom Publishing, 2009. ISBN 978-0558162320.
- James Como, The Folk Tales of Brusco and Giovanni, CreateSpace Independent Publishing, 2015. ISBN 978-1514859902.
- James Como, Carry Me Home: Ten Tales for the Childlike, KDP, 2020. ISBN 979-8577051266.
- James Como, From Parlor to Public Square: A Very Brief Course on Our Many Conversations, KDP, 2023. ISBN 979-8373636117.
- James Como, Truly: A Selection of Essays and Stories, KDP, 2025. ISBN 979-8313641287.
