= National Intelligence Managers for Aviation =

National Air Intelligence Integration Office -NAI2O-
- National Intelligence Manager for Aviation (NIM - A)
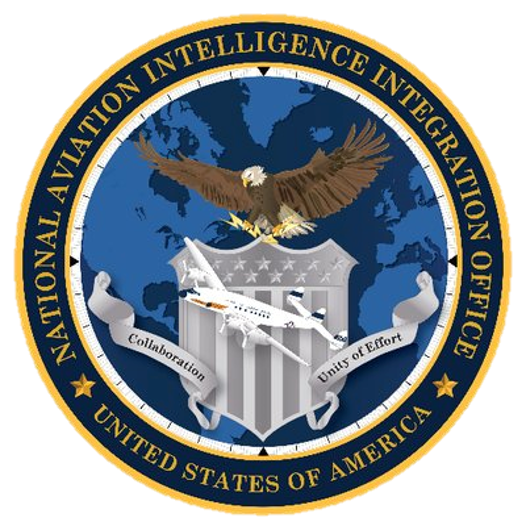

Agency overview
- Formed: June 1st, 2015
- Preceding agency: Air Domain Intelligence Integration Element
- Headquarters: Joint Base Anacostia–Bolling, Washington, D.C.
- Employees: 13 (2016)
- Agency executive: Director; Deputy Director
- Parent agency: Director of National Intelligence
- Website: https://www.airdomainintelligence.mil/

In June 2015, the National Air Intelligence Integration Office (NAI2O) was appointed as the lead organization for coordinating and integrating the United States Government's (USG) Intelligence Community (IC) perspective on Air Domain issues. NAI20 brings together the Global Aviation Community Of Interest (GACOI) to improve civil aviation safety and security through communication and intelligence/information sharing in order to produce integrated and actionable aviation intelligence. NAI2O is located in Southeast Washington, DC on Joint Base Anacostia-Bolling (JBAB).

The concept of the NAI2O originated in the findings of The National Commission on Terrorist Attacks Upon the United States (also known as the 9/11_Commission), The Intelligence Reform and Terror Prevention Act (IRTPA), Presidential directives, and additional USG and IC aviation security plans.

To expand its efforts in the Air Domain community, NAI2O updated its title to the National Intelligence Managers for Aviation (NIM-AV) in support of The Office of the Director of National Intelligence's (ODNI) Strategic Guidance. NIM-Air accomplishes this, in part by orchestrating Inter-Agency (IA) & IC collaboration on the collection & production of all relevant and appropriate information required to fully inform USG leaders, thus enabling clear & concise policy and resource decisions to be made in an efficient manner.

== Initiatives ==
- Guide intelligence collection and analysis to address current and emerging threats and vulnerabilities
- Integrate Intelligence Community (IC) and external partner efforts and capabilities to maximize the air domain enterprise's mission effectiveness
- Advise senior leaders to ensure decision advantage and promulgate strategic guidance to secure the Air Domain
- Synchronize the Intelligence Community's C-UAS activities to ensure unity efforts

== Partners ==
Current partners include:

- Federal Agencies
- State Agencies
- Representatives from the private aviation industry and academia
- International partners
