= Ole J. Kleppa =

American chemist

Ole Kleppa
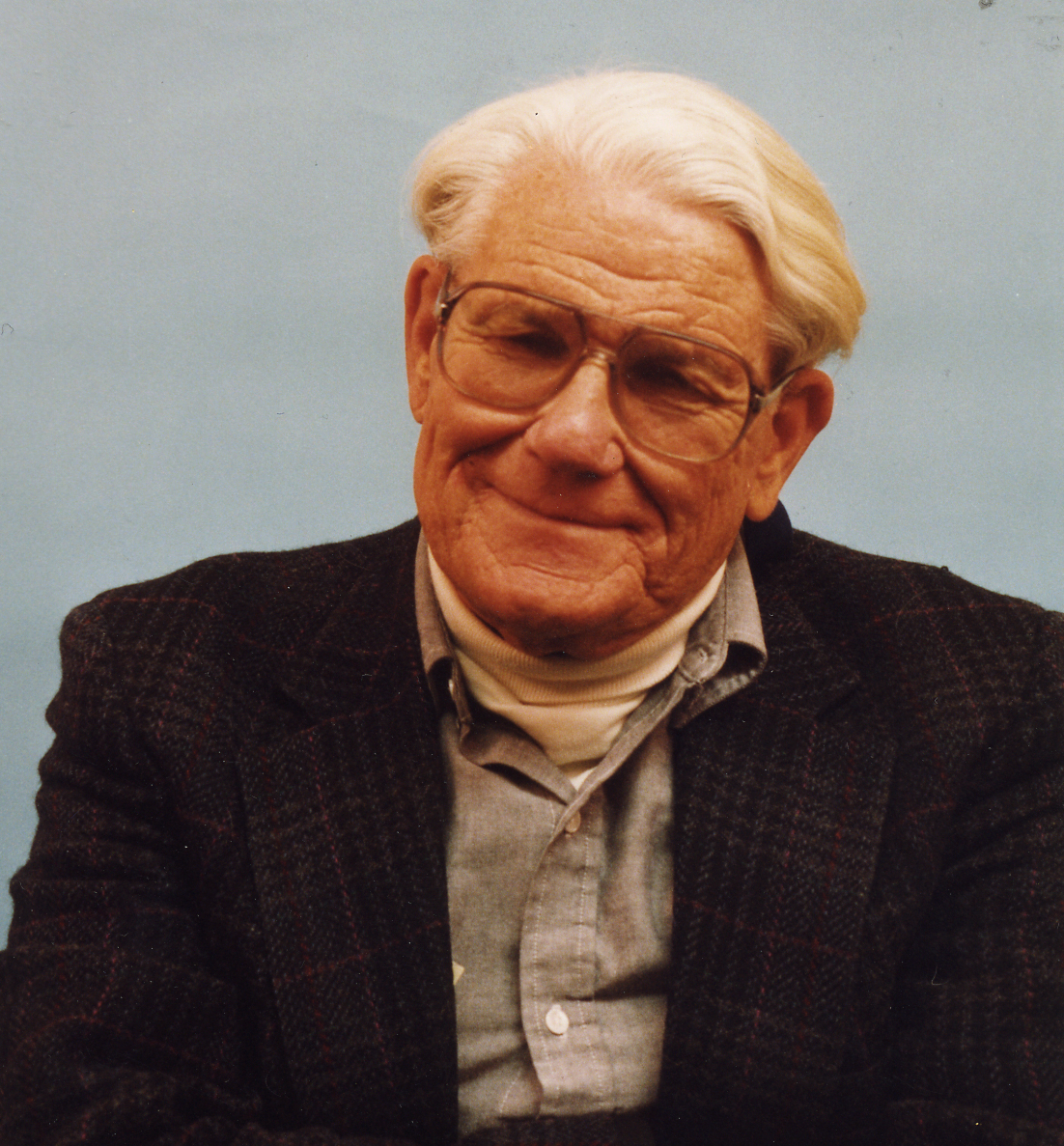
- Ole Kleppa, circa 2000
- Born: Ole Jakob Kleppa; February 4, 1920; Kristiania, Norway
- Died: May 27, 2007 (aged 87); Lubbock, Texas, United States
- Education: Norwegian Institute of Technology
- Known for: Invention of the Kleppa Calorimeter
- Awards: Huffman Memorial Award (1982), U.S. Scientist Humboldt Award (1983–1984), Hume Rothery Award (1994)
- Scientific career
- Fields: Physical chemistry
- Workplaces: University of Chicago
- Notable students: Reatha King, Alexandra Navrotsky

Ole Jakob Kleppa (February 4, 1920 – May 27, 2007) was a Norwegian–American physical chemist and a pioneer and leading authority in the study of metals, molten salts, ceramics and minerals at high temperatures. Kleppa was a professor at the University of Chicago, where he held appointments in the department of chemistry, the department of geophysical sciences, the James Franck Institute, and the college. He was the director of the James Franck Institute and the materials research laboratory.

== Biography ==
Kleppa was born in Kristiania, Norway to Per and Karen Kleppa. After completing secondary school, Kleppa received his Master of Science degree in chemical engineering in 1946 and his Ph.D. in 1956 from the Norwegian Institute of Technology.

=== During World War II ===
His education, however, was interrupted by the German invasion of Norway. As a leader in student government, Kleppa helped organize organized readings at which participants extolled freedom and Norwegian nationalism and took part in other resistance activities. Feeling that the situation was getting dangerous, Kleppa along with five or six others then decided to disguise themselves as berry pickers and flee Norway for neutral Sweden. After the war, Kleppa learned from his aunt that he crossed the border on the very day that she had received a letter from the Gestapo seeking to question him. After a year of teaching chemistry and physics in Uppsala, Sweden he flew to Great Britain, where he served in the Norwegian Army as an intelligence officer.

Kleppa served as an officer in a Norwegian military unit while in Britain. In 1943, he was sent to Iceland for eight months to teach U.S. soldiers to work in cold weather environments and to train them in winter warfare tactics. In Iceland Kleppa also befriended Kristjan Eldjarn, who later became Iceland's third president.

=== At the University of Chicago ===
The author of over 350 scientific publications, Ole Kleppa worked at the University of Chicago from 1947 until his death in 2007. He arrived at the university shortly after marrying his wife, Abbie Joy Stodder. As a scientist at Chicago, Kleppa developed a series of calorimeters capable of making difficult scientific measurements less complicated. One of his primary achievements was the development of the Kleppa calorimeter, an instrument that measures tiny amounts of heat as new materials form at high temperatures. He built a series of calorimeters in order to measure precise enthalpies of formation at high temperatures. Kleppa's calorimeters determined how much energy a particular compound alloy, or mineral requires to form. The results of these findings were much sought after by engineers and scientists working on marketable applications and by curious theoreticians pursuing basic research.

The alloys, minerals, and compounds that Kleppa collected and interpreted data on has been widely used in the aviation industry and by physicists developing superconducting materials for advanced technological applications including nuclear reactors. Ole Kleppa also made a unique contribution to the field of molten salts, as his measurements and methods gave rise to great progress in the field.

Kleppa served as the associate director of the James Franck Institute from 1968 to 1971 and then its director from 1971 to 1977. He also served as director of the materials research lab at the University of Chicago from 1984 to 1987. During his career, he held positions on the board of editors of the Journal of Chemical Thermodynamics, Journal of Physical Chemistry, and Journal of Phase Equilibria. Kleppa was a member of the Royal Norwegian Society of Sciences and Letters, of the Norwegian Institute of Technology, and a Fellow of ASM International and of the American Association for the Advancement of Science.

Kleppa retired as a professor emeritus in 1990, but he maintained his lab and continued to receive grants until his death. He held on to his Norwegian citizenship until 2000, when he became a U.S. citizen. He was a friend and colleague of R. Stephen Berry, Stuart Rice, Robert Gomer, Thomas Rosenbaum, and Nobel Laureates Yoichiro Nambu and Subrahmanyan Chandrasekhar.

Ole Kleppa died on May 27, 2007, at University Medical Center in Lubbock, Texas. Following his death, Norwegian scientist Stein Julsrud said "It is truly one of the most important contributors to physical chemistry in the post-war era that has now passed away".
