= Methionine S-methyltransferase =

Identifiers
- EC no.: 2.1.1.12
- CAS no.: 9027-77-4

Databases
- IntEnz: IntEnz view
- BRENDA: BRENDA entry
- ExPASy: NiceZyme view
- KEGG: KEGG entry
- MetaCyc: metabolic pathway
- PRIAM: profile
- PDB structures: RCSB PDB PDBe PDBsum
- Gene Ontology: AmiGO / QuickGO
Search
- PMC: articles
- PubMed: articles
- NCBI: proteins

Methionine S-methyltransferase (EC 2.1.1.12) is an enzyme that catalyzes the chemical reaction

L-methionine
+ SAM
S-methyl-L-methioninate
+ SAH

L-methionine is converted to S-methyl-L-methioninate using the coenzyme, S-adenosyl methionine (SAM), which transfers a methyl group, becoming S-adenosylhomocysteine (SAH).

This enzyme belongs to the family of transferases, specifically those transferring one-carbon group methyltransferases. The systematic name of this enzyme class is S-adenosyl-L-methionine:L-methionine S-methyltransferase. Other names in common use include S-adenosyl methionine:methionine methyl transferase, methionine methyltransferase, S-adenosylmethionine transmethylase, and S-adenosylmethionine-methionine methyltransferase. It requires manganese or zinc ions to function.
