= National Association of Corporate Directors =

American professional association

- Founded: December 19, 1977; 48 years ago
- Type: National Director Membership Organization
- Purpose: Director education, board development, director recruitment services, credentialing
- Location(s): 1100 Wilson Blvd; Arlington, Virginia, U.S.
- Region served: Nationwide
- Method: Public, private, and nonprofit company surveys, educational events, conferences, publications
- Members: 24,000+
- Key people: Peter Gleason, Kimberly Simpson, Friso van der Oord, Mary Winston
- Website: www.nacdonline.org

The National Association of Corporate Directors (NACD) is an independent, not-for-profit, section 501(c)(3) founded in 1977 and headquartered in Arlington, Virginia. NACD's membership includes more than 1,750 corporate boards as well as several thousand individual members, for a total of more than 24,000 members. Membership is open to individual board members and corporate boards of public, private, and nonprofit organizations from both the United States and overseas.

NACD and a network of more than 20 chapters across 35 U.S. locations provide a peer-to-peer network and education and learning through live and virtual events. Together, NACD and the Chapter Network engage directors looking to cultivate meaningful peer relationships, share real-world experiences and build their knowledge.

NACD is a founding member of The Global Network of Director Institutes (GNDI). Formed in 2012 to enhance collaboration among its members, GNDI provides directors and their boards with access to a wide array of global resources. The network includes 24 institutes and represents over 150,000 directors and governance professionals.

== History ==
NACD was founded in 1977 with the goal to educate directors. In 1978 it announced the first comprehensive Director Education Program. Ten years later, NACD recognized the first Director of the Year. In 1993, NACD published its first Blue Ribbon Commission Report, offering ten principles to guide audit committees and their oversight of financial reporting as well as risk management and internal and external auditors. In the early 2000s, NACD's Blue Ribbon Commission Report on Board Evaluations helped optimize board composition, while the organization helped shape Sarbanes-Oxley and influence the new New York Stock Exchange (NYSE) and NASDAQ listing rules. In 2004, NACD co-founded the Global Director Development Circle, launched in response to the need to keep directors ahead of international corporate governance and legislation. This program led NACD to globalize the Certificate of Director Education program in 2006. The program has since evolved into the Global Network of Director Institutes. In 2010, NACD acquired Directorship magazine, a magazine dedicated to today's corporate officers and board of directors.

== Mission and Vision ==
NACD's mission, as stated on its website, is "We empower directors and transform boards to be future ready." And their vision is that corporate boards are recognized as trusted catalysts of economic change - in business and in the communities they serve.

== Advocacy ==
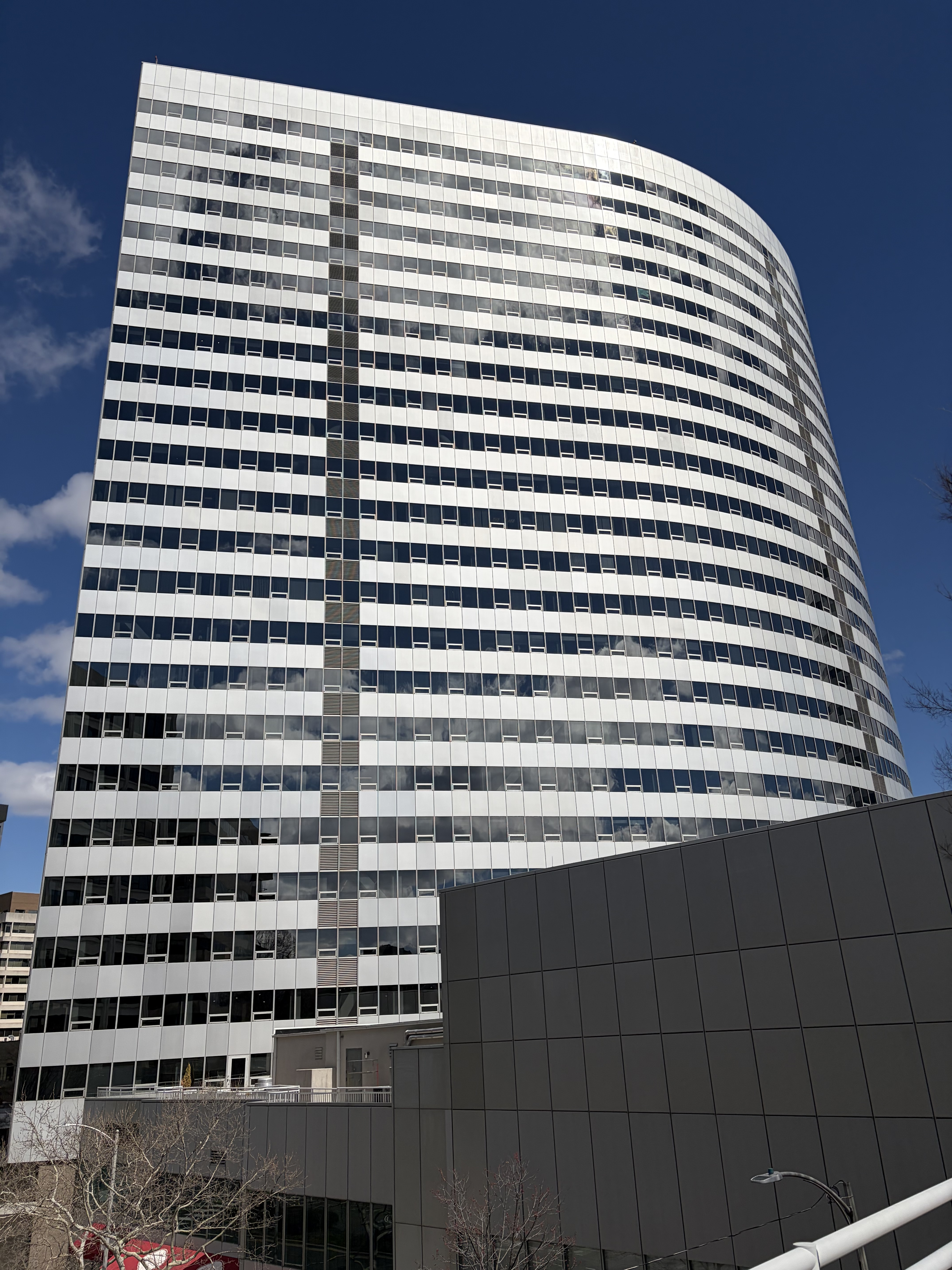
NACD is located in the Rosslyn Twin Towers in Arlington, Virginia.

NACD provides educational advocacy and resources to policymakers and regulators that have a role in helping corporate directors achieve good governance and create trust in capital markets.

NACD has long-standing relationships with the U.S. Securities and Exchange Commission (SEC), Public Company Accounting Oversight Board (PCAOB), key enforcement agencies such as the Federal Bureau of Investigation (FBI) and others like the Cybersecurity and Infrastructure Security Agency (CISA). These relationships have created opportunities for NACD to inform the board director community and reinforce that corporate boards are trusted stewards and catalysts of economic growth and opportunity, and long-term value creation.

NACD submitted a comment letter to the FDIC in 2024 expressing concern that proposed governance and risk management standards could create many unintended consequences beyond the banking system. In 2023, it submitted a letter to the PCAOB's NOCLAR proposal that raised concerns that the proposal would have substantial impact and costs (without commensurate benefits) on audit committees' duties and responsibilities and that it would drastically change the current model of work for audit committees, management, and auditors. In 2022 NACD commented on the SEC's cybersecurity risk management proposal and climate disclosure proposal, agreeing with the intent of the proposed rules and emphasizing its support for consistent disclosure while calling out the potential impacts of new rules on the board and governance.

In both cases, the SEC incorporated NACD feedback on the concept of single-issue directors. In both final rules, the requirement to identify the individual experts on the board was dropped. Also, the SEC incorporated NACD feedback on the role of the board versus management, as they cited in the final climate disclosure rule.

== Courses and Events ==
NACD delivers more than 400 programs nationwide to 24,000+ directors each year. These include national and chapter events, foundation courses, the annual NACD Directors Summit, peer-to-peer roundtables, specialty events, and online learning opportunities.

=== NACD Directors Summit ===
NACD Directors Summit is an annual event for members where the most influential minds in governance gather to advance board effectiveness. It's an experience that celebrates opportunity and positive change in boardrooms, and the event attracts thousands of professionals.

=== Special events ===
NACD specialty programming includes signature annual events and new programming to reflect emerging trends in the directorship field. These events include NACD Directorship 100, NACD DE&I Awards, and From Battlefield to Boardroom.

=== Foundation courses ===
NACD offers director education courses as the foundation of their primary credential, NACD Directorship Certification. The former NACD Fellowship® was phased out in 2023.

Virtual Director Professionalism® is the prerequisite course for certification and provides directors with boardroom fundamentals.

=== Virtual learning ===
NACD's virtual learning programs offer comprehensive education for current and aspiring boardroom leaders. Programs include webinars, Directorship Essentials series, and the Art of Directorship series.

=== Peer-to-peer programs ===
NACD offers various peer-to-peer programming events throughout the year. Programs include Advisory Councils, General Counsel programming, and Chapter programs.

== Credentials ==
NACD enables directors to earn credentials.

== Governance Resources ==
- NACD Board Advisory Services®: NACD offers in-boardroom education, board assessments, governance reviews, board composition and succession planning, ongoing advisory services, and cyber- risk -reporting to deliver industry-leading insights and analysis to boards.
- NACD Center for Inclusive Governance® (CFIG): In 2021, NACD launched the NACD Center for Inclusive Governance to address the need for boards to diversify and ensure that the new and diverse voices on boards are heard. CFIG supports these directors through leadership, events, and credentialing with a goal to create an environment that embraces equity and welcomes new perspectives in the boardroom.
- Future of the American Board: A Framework for Governing into the Future: The report gives the full board and committees a clear road map and implementation guidance for building high-performance governance in the face of the most influential trends shaping society and transforming businesses.
- Blue Ribbon Commission: Each year, NACD leverages the perspectives and experience of its more than 24,000 members, and appoints a Blue Ribbon Commission, an experienced collective of directors, investors, subject-matter experts, and leading governance professionals. The Commission engages in an extensive process to examine and develop recommendations and tools to address the most challenging issues facing boards. Blue Ribbon Commission Reports (BRCs) have been strengthening corporate governance for three decades.
- NACD Director Compensation Report: analyzes annual pay levels and practices among 1,400 companies across 24 industries with revenue from $50 million to more than $10 billion. NACD and Pearl Meyer annually release the NACD Director Compensation Report.
- Annual Governance Surveys: annual surveys of more than 1,000 public, private and nonprofit directors on leading governance practices.
- NACD Directorship® magazine: the official magazine of NACD, reporting on current issues of importance to directors and boards.
- NACD Director Essentials: guidance on issues such as cyber-risk oversight, corporate sustainability, effective director onboarding practices and other topics.

== Role in the corporate governance movement ==
In 2001 and 2002, the unexpected bankruptcies of Enron and WorldCom brought increased public and government attention to corporate governance and the role of the board of directors. In February 2002, Roger Raber, former CEO of NACD, was called to testify before the House Energy and Commerce Committee, chaired by Billy Tauzin (R-LA), regarding the failure of Enron Corporation. At the request of Committee, Raber submitted 10 suggested standards, based on the Report of the NACD Blue Ribbon Commission on Director Professionalism (1996/2001/2005), for public company governance, submitting the same to the New York Stock Exchange (NYSE) and the NASDAQ on May 1, 2002. In November 2003, the Securities and Exchange Commission approved new listing requirements for both, which were influenced by NACD's recommendations.

The ten core recommendations are as follows:

== NACD and the Securities and Exchange Commission ==
- 2003-2004 Former NACD CEO Roger Raber and former NACD Chair B. Kenneth West co-signed three letters on Re: File Number S7-19-03 “Security Holder Director Nominations” (34-48626). During this time NACD Board member Warren Batts appeared at an SEC Roundtable devoted to the topic.
- 2005- 2006 NACD Director Michelle Hooper wrote a letter and participated twice at SEC-PCAOB Roundtables regarding internal control reporting and auditing provisions of Section 404 of the Sarbanes-Oxley Act. Another NACD Director, the Barbara Hackman Franklin, has similarly participated, under her own name, rather than as an NACD representative.
- 2009 NACD President and CEO Ken Daly and Chair Barbara Hackman Franklin co-signed a letter to Elizabeth Murphy, Secretary of the U.S. Securities and Exchange Commission, commenting on the proposed rule on proxy disclosure and solicitation enhancements.
- 2011 NACD President and CEO Ken Daly testified before the U.S. House of Representatives Subcommittee on Capital Markets and Government Sponsored Enterprises, commenting on the legislative proposals to address the negative consequences of the Dodd-Frank whistleblower provisions.
- 2013 NACD President and CEO Ken Daly and Chair Reatha Clark King co-signed a letter to Elizabeth Murray, Secretary of the U.S. Securities and Exchange Commission, commenting on the proposed rule for pay ratio disclosure, issued by the SEC on September 18, 2013.
- 2022 NACD President and CEO Peter Gleason signed a letter to Vanessa A. Countryman, Secretary of the U.S. Securities and Exchange Commission, commenting on the proposed rules for cyber risk management, issued by the SEC on March 9, 2022.
- 2022 NACD President and CEO Peter Gleason signed a letter to Vanessa A. Countryman, Secretary of the U.S. Securities and Exchange Commission, commenting on the proposed rules for climate leadership in the boardroom, issued by the SEC on March 21, 2022.
