= PAH =

PAH or Pah may refer to:

== Science and technology ==
=== Chemistry ===
- Polycyclic aromatic hydrocarbon, one of a class of chemical compounds, organic pollutants
  - PAH world hypothesis, hypothesis that proposes that the use of polycyclic aromatic hydrocarbons was a means for the origin of life
- Polyallylamine hydrochloride, a polyelectrolyte used in polymer sheets
- Polyanhydrides, a class of biodegradable polymers
- Photoacid, where H indicates an H atom lost by an acid

=== Medicine ===
- Para-aminohippurate, a substance used in the measurement of blood flow in the kidneys
  - PAH clearance, Para-aminohippuric acid clearance, a measurement of renal plasma flow
- Paradoxical adipose hyperplasia, a potential complication of cryolipolysis
- Phenylalanine hydroxylase, an enzyme involved in breaking down phenylalanine
- Primary alveolar hypoventilation, a condition of inadequate air movement in the lungs
- Pulmonary arterial hypertension, a condition of elevated blood pressure in the pulmonary artery

== Organizations ==
- Plataforma de Afectados por la Hipoteca, a Spanish housing rights organization
- Polish Humanitarian Action, a Polish non-governmental organisation (Polish: Polska Akcja Humanitarna)
- Russian Academy of Sciences, Russian: Российская Академия Наук (РАН)
- National Weather Service Paducah, Kentucky (WFO ID PAH)

== People ==
- Pah Wongso, born Victor Wijnhamer, Jr., (Chinese: 伯王梭; pinyin: Bó Wángsuō), an Indo social worker

== Places ==
- Pan-American Highway
- Pah, Gujarat, a village and former non-salute Rajput princely state in Gujarat, India
- Pah Homestead, a historic home in Hillsborough, Auckland, New Zealand
- Barkley Regional Airport, Paducah, Kentucky, U.S., IATA airport code PAH
- Pah-Ute County, Arizona Territory

== Other ==
- Pah, the lunar deity in Pawnee mythology
- Pah Wraith, in the fictional Star Trek universe
- Obsolete spelling of a Māori pā fortification
