= Photon upconversion =

Optical process

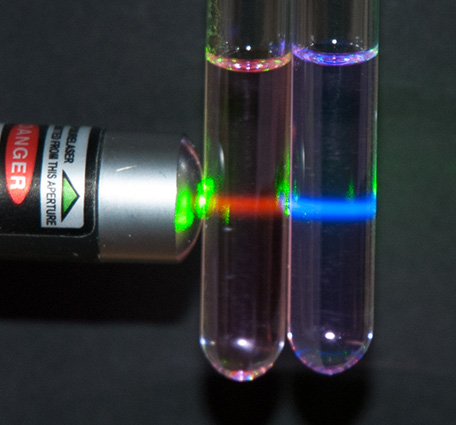
Example of normal Stokes emission through fluorescence (left, red) and anti-Stokes emission (right, blue) through sensitized triplet-triplet annihilation based photon upconversion, samples excited with green light.

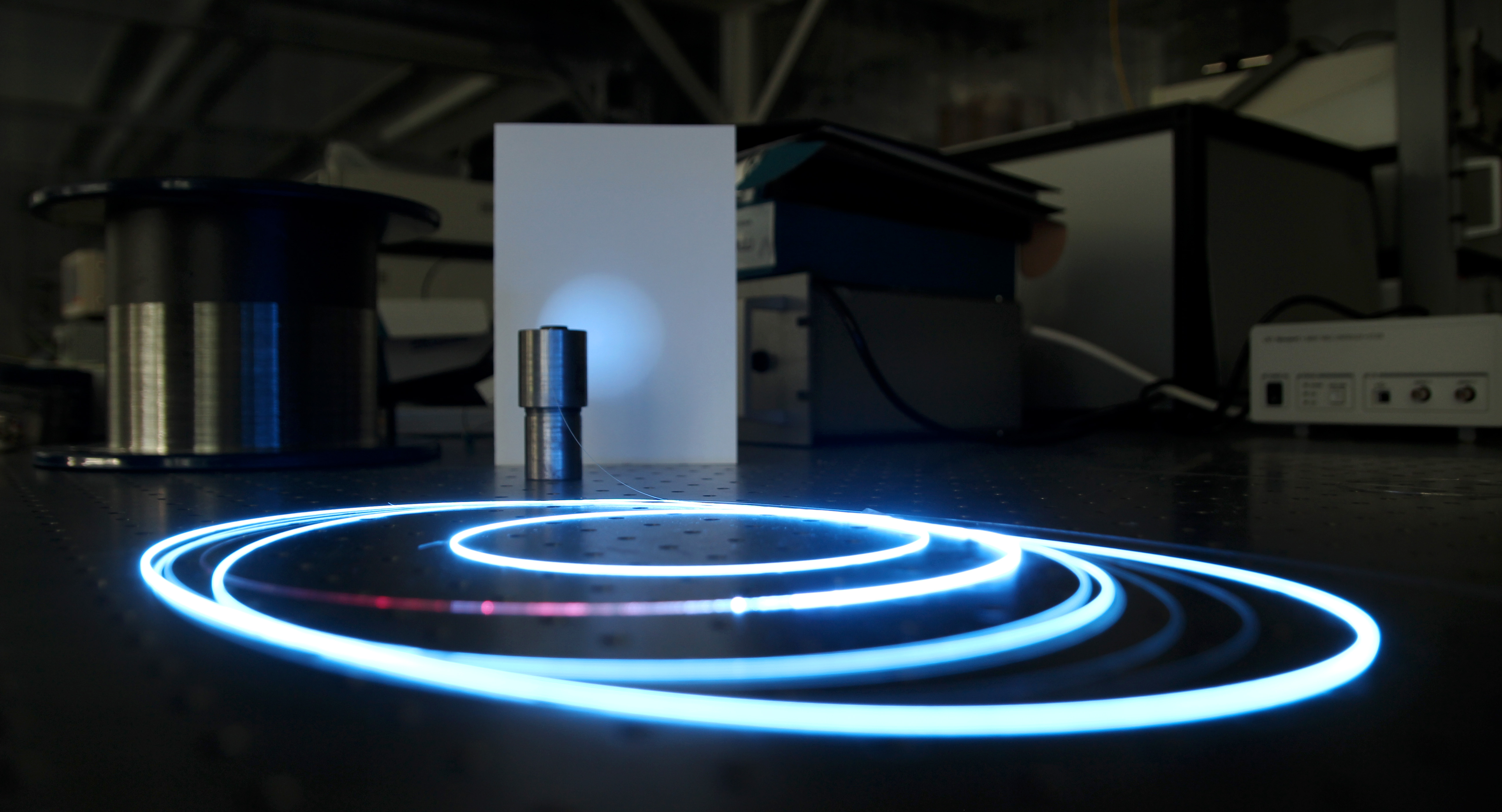
Upconversion fluorescence. Optical fiber that contains infrared light shines with a blue color in the dark

Photon upconversion (UC) is a process in which the sequential absorption of two or more photons leads to the emission of light at shorter wavelength than the excitation wavelength. It is an anti-Stokes type emission. An example is the conversion of infrared light to visible light. Upconversion can take place in both organic and inorganic materials, through a number of different mechanisms. Organic molecules that can achieve photon upconversion through triplet-triplet annihilation are typically polycyclic aromatic hydrocarbons (PAHs). Inorganic materials capable of photon upconversion often contain ions of d-block or f-block elements. Examples of these ions are Ln^{3+}, Ti^{2+}, Ni^{2+}, Mo^{3+}, Re^{4+}, Os^{4+}, and so on.

== Physical mechanisms ==
There are three basic mechanisms for photon upconversion in inorganic materials and at least two distinct mechanisms in organic materials. In inorganic materials photon upconversion occurs through energy transfer upconversion (ETU), excited-state absorption (ESA) and photon avalanche (PA). Such processes can be observed in materials with very different sizes and structures, including optical fibers, bulk crystals or nanoparticles, as long as they contain any of the active ions mentioned above. Organic molecules can upconvert photons through sensitized triplet-triplet annihilation (sTTA) and energy pooling.

Upconversion should be distinguished from two-photon absorption and second-harmonic generation. These two physical processes have a similar outcome to photon upconversion (emission of photons of shorter wavelength than the excitation) but the mechanism behind is different. An early proposal (a solid-state IR quantum counter) was made by Nicolaas Bloembergen in 1959 and the process was first observed by François Auzel in 1966.

A thermal upconversion mechanism is also possible. This mechanism is based on the absorption of photons with low energies in the upconverter, which heats up and re-emits photons with higher energies. To improve this process, the density of optical states of the upconverter can be carefully engineered to provide frequency- and angularly-selective emission characteristics. For example, a planar thermal upconverting platform can have a front surface that absorbs low-energy photons incident within a narrow angular range, and a back surface that efficiently emits only high-energy photons. These surface properties can be realized through designs of photonic crystals, and theories and experiments have been demonstrated on thermophotovoltaics and passive radiative cooling. Under best criterion, energy conversion efficiency from solar radiation to electricity by introducing up-converter can go up to 73% using AM1.5D spectrum and 76% considering sun as a black body source at 6,000 K for a single-junction cell.

=== Sensitized triplet-triplet annihilation ===
Sensitized triplet-triplet annihilation (sTTA) based photon upconversion is a bimolecular process that through a number of energy transfer steps, efficiently combines two low frequency photons into one photon of higher frequency. TTA systems consist of one absorbing species, the sensitizer, and one emitting species, the emitter (or annihilator). Emitters are typically polyaromatic chromophores with large singlet-triplet energy splitting, such as anthracene and its derivatives.

The first step in sensitized triplet-triplet annihilation is absorption of a low energy photon by the sensitizer. The sensitizer then populates its first triplet excited state (^{3}Sen*) after intersystem crossing (ISC). The excitation energy on the sensitizer then transfers through a Dexter type triplet energy transfer (TET) to a ground state emitter, generating a triplet excited emitter (^{3}Em*). Two triplet excited emitters then interact in a second energy transfer process, known as triplet-triplet annihilation (TTA). Upon TTA the triplet energies are fused leaving one emitter in its excited singlet state (^{1}Em*) and the other emitter in its ground state. From the singlet excited state the emitter returns to the ground state through the emission of a photon. In this way two low energy photons are converted into one photon of higher energy. The principle relies on long lived triplet states to temporarily store the photon energy. Since molecular oxygen effectively quenches triplet states it is important that samples are thoroughly degassed or encapsulated to function efficiently.

Photon upconversion through sensitized triplet-triplet annihilation has the advantage of being efficient even at low excitation intensities making it potentially useful for converting sun light to enhance solar cell efficiencies.

== Upconverting nanoparticles ==
Although photon upconversion was first studied in bulk crystals and optical fibers, it became better known with the development of nanomaterials. This happened due to the many ways in which nanostructures with photon upconversion properties can be applied. This new class of materials may broadly be referred to as upconverting nanoparticles or UCNPs.

=== Lanthanide-doped nanoparticles ===
Lanthanide-doped nanoparticles emerged in the late 1990s owing to the increasing focus on nanotechnology. Although their optical transitions essentially resemble those in bulk materials, the nanostructure amenable to surface modifications results in improved or new characteristics. Besides, the small size of the particles allow their use as alternatives to molecular fluorophores for biological applications. Their unique optical properties, such as large Stokes shift and the lack of blinking, have enabled them to rival conventional luminescent probes in challenging tasks including single-molecule tracking and deep tissue imaging. In the case of bioimaging, as lanthanide-doped nanoparticles can be excited with near-infrared light, they can reduce autofluorescence of biological samples and thus improve the contrast of the image.

Lanthanide-doped nanoparticles are nanocrystals of a transparent material (more often the fluorides NaYF_{4}, NaGdF_{4}, LiYF_{4}, YF_{3}, CaF_{2} or oxides such as Gd_{2}O_{3}) doped with lanthanide ions. The most common lanthanide ions used in photon upconversion are the pairs erbium-ytterbium (Er^{3+},Yb^{3+}) or thulium-ytterbium (Tm^{3+}, Yb^{3+}). In such combinations ytterbium ions are added as antennas, to absorb light at around 980 nm and transfer it to the upconverter ion. If this ion is erbium, then a characteristic green and red emission is observed, while when the upconverter ion is thulium, the emission includes near-ultraviolet, blue and red light.

Despite the promising aspects of these nanomaterials, one urgent task that confronts materials chemists lies in the synthesis of nanoparticles with tunable emission, which is essential for applications in multiplexed imaging and sensing. The development of a reproducible, high yield synthetic route that allows controlled growth of rare earth halide nanoparticles has enabled the development and commercialization of upconversion nanoparticles in many different bioapplications. The recent progress in this direction includes the synthesis of structured nanocrystals crystals, such as particles with a core/shell structure, allowing upconversion through interfacial energy transfer (IET).

=== Semiconductor nanoparticles ===
Semiconductor nanoparticles or quantum dots have often been demonstrated to emit light of shorter wavelength than the excitation following a two-photon absorption mechanism, not photon upconversion. However, recently the use of semiconductor nanoparticles, such as CdSe, PbS and PbSe as sensitizers combined with molecular emitters has been shown as a new strategy for photon upconversion through triplet-triplet annihilation. They have been used to upconvert 980 nm infrared light to 600 nm visible light; green light to blue light; and blue light to ultraviolet. This technique benefits from a very high upconverting capability. Especially, these materials can be used to capture the infrared region of sunlight to electricity and enhance the efficiency of photovoltaic solar cells.

=== Upconversion nanocapsules for differential cancer bioimaging in vivo ===
Early diagnosis of tumor malignancy is crucial for timely cancer treatment aimed at imparting desired clinical outcomes. The traditional fluorescence-based imaging is unfortunately faced with challenges such as low tissue penetration and background autofluorescence. Upconversion (UC)-based bioimaging can overcome these limitations as their excitation occurs at lower frequencies and the emission at higher frequencies. Kwon et al. developed multifunctional silica-based nanocapsules, synthesized to encapsulate two distinct triplet-triplet annihilation UC chromophore pairs. Each nanocapsule emits different colors, blue or green, following a red light excitation. These nanocapsules were further conjugated with either antibodies or peptides to selectively target breast or colon cancer cells, respectively. Both in vitro and in vivo experimental results demonstrated cancer-specific and differential-color imaging from single wavelength excitation as well as far greater accumulation at targeted tumor sites than that due to the enhanced permeability and retention effect. This approach can be used to host a variety of chromophore pairs for various tumor-specific, color-coding scenarios and can be employed for diagnosis of a wide range of cancer types within the heterogeneous tumor microenvironment.

== See also ==
- Spontaneous parametric down-conversion
