= Upconverting nanoparticles =

Photoluminescent particles

Upconverting nanoparticles (UCNPs) are nanoscale particles (diameter 1–100 nm) that exhibit photon upconversion. In photon upconversion, two or more incident photons of relatively low energy are absorbed and converted into one emitted photon with higher energy. Generally, absorption occurs in the infrared, while emission occurs in the visible or ultraviolet regions of the electromagnetic spectrum. UCNPs are usually composed of rare-earth based lanthanide- or actinide-doped transition metals and are of particular interest for their applications in in vivo bio-imaging, bio-sensing, and nanomedicine because of their highly efficient cellular uptake and high optical penetrating power with little background noise in the deep tissue level. They also have potential applications in photovoltaics and security, such as infrared detection of hazardous materials.

Before 1959, the anti-Stokes shift was believed to describe all situations in which emitted photons have higher energies than the corresponding incident photons. An anti-Stokes shift occurs when a thermally excited ground state is electronically excited, leading to a shift of only a few k_{B}T, where k_{B} is the Boltzmann constant, and T is temperature. At room temperature, k_{B}T is 25.7 meV. In 1959, Nicolaas Bloembergen proposed an energy diagram for crystals containing ionic impurities. Bloembergen described the system as having excited-state emissions with energy differences much greater than k_{B}T, in contrast to the anti-Stokes shift.

Advances in laser technology in the 1960s allowed the observation of non-linear optical effects such as upconversion. This led to the experimental discovery of photon upconversion in 1966 by François Auzel. Auzel showed that a photon of infrared light could be upconverted into a photon of visible light in ytterbium–erbium and ytterbium–thulium systems. In a transition-metal lattice doped with rare-earth metals, an excited-state charge transfer exists between two excited ions. Auzel observed that this charge transfer allows an emission of photon with much higher energy than the corresponding absorbed photon. Thus, upconversion can occur through a stable and real excited state, supporting Bloembergen's earlier work. This result catapulted upconversion research in lattices doped with rare-earth metals. One of the first examples of efficient lanthanide doping, the Yb/Er-doped fluoride lattice, was achieved in 1972 by Menyuk et al.

== Physics ==
Photon upconversion belongs to a larger class of processes by which light incident on a material induces anti-Stokes emission. Multiple quanta of energy such as photons or phonons are absorbed, and a single photon with the summed energy is emitted. It is important to make the distinction between photon upconversion, where real metastable excited states allow for sequential absorption, and other nonlinear processes like second-harmonic generation or two-photon excited fluorescence which involve virtual intermediate states such as the "simultaneous" absorption of two or more photons. It is also distinct from more weakly anti-Stokes processes like thermoluminescence or anti-Stokes Raman emission, which are due to initial thermal population of low-lying excited states and consequently show emission energies only a few k_{B}T above the excitation. Photon upconversion is distinctly characterized by emission-excitation differences of 10–100 k_{B}T and an observable fluorescence lifetime after the excitation source has been switched off.

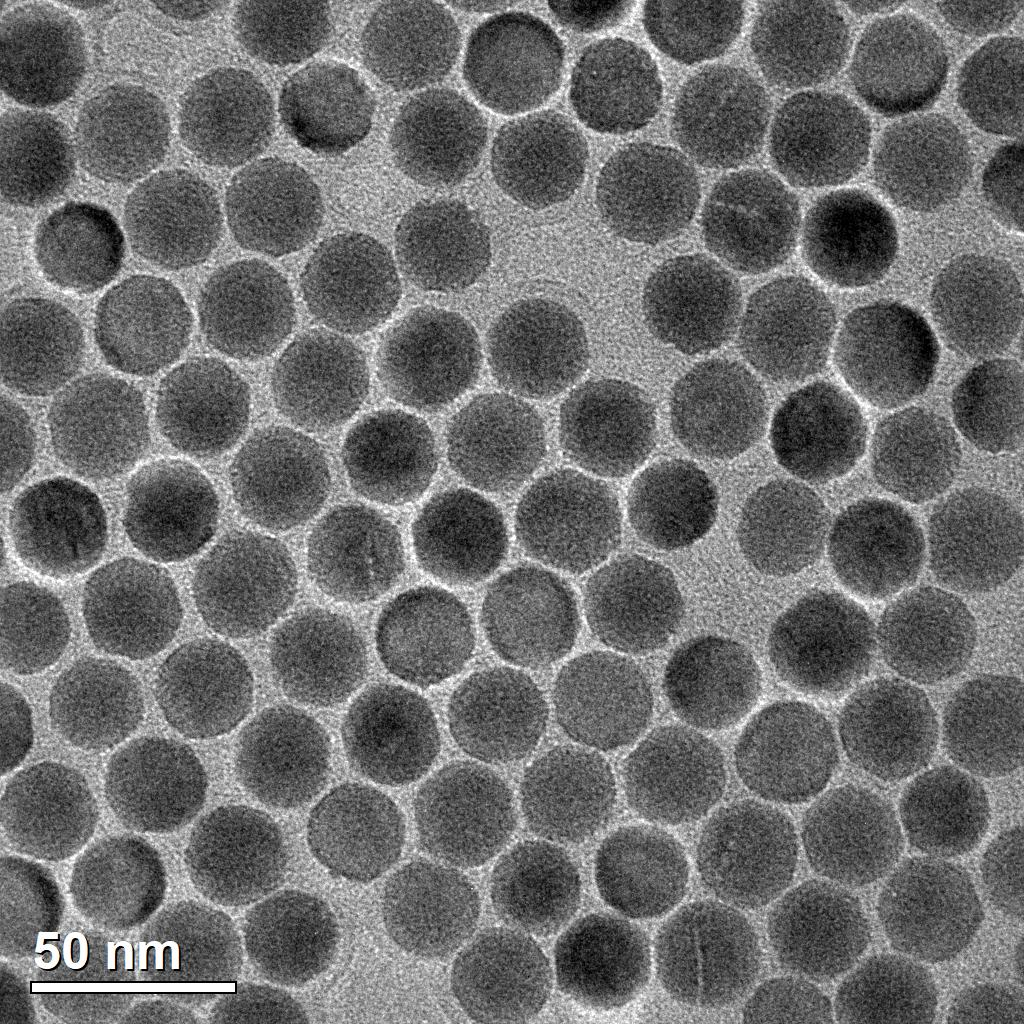
TEM image of typical upconversion nanocrystals

Photon upconversion relies on metastable states to facilitate sequential energy absorption. Therefore, a necessary condition for upconverting systems is the existence of optically active long-lived excited states. This role is traditionally filled by lanthanide metal ions embedded in an insulating host lattice. Generally in the +3 oxidation state, these ions have 4fn electronic configurations and typically exhibit f-f transitions. These 4f orbitals allow for complex electronic structures and a large number of possible electronic excited states with similar energies. When embedded in bulk crystals or nanostructures, the energies of these excited states will further split under crystal field, generating a series of states with many closely spaced energies. The 4f shell is localized near the core of the ion and is therefore non-bonding, while the 5s and 5p shells provide further shielding from the exterior crystal field. Thus, the coupling of electronic excited states to the surrounding lattice is weak, leading to long excited state lifetimes and sharp optical lineshapes.

The physical processes responsible for upconversion in nanoparticles are the same as those in bulk crystals on the microscopic level, although total efficiency and other ensemble effects will have unique considerations in the nanoparticle case. The processes contributing to upconversion may be grouped according to the number of ions involved. The two most common processes by which upconversion can occur in lanthanide-doped nanoscale materials are excited state absorption (ESA) and energy transfer upconversion (ETU).

A single ion in the lattice sequentially absorbs two photons and emits a photon of higher energy as it returns to the ground state. ESA is most common when dopant concentrations are low and energy-transfer is not probable. Since ESA is a process where two photons must be absorbed at a single lattice site, coherent pumping and high intensity are much more important (but not necessarily required) than for ETU. Because of its single-ion nature, ESA does not depend on the lanthanide ion concentration.

Two-ion processes are usually dominated by ETU. This is characterized by the successive transfer of energy from singly excited ions (sensitizers/donors), to the ion which eventually emits (activators/acceptors). This process is commonly portrayed as the optical excitation of the activator followed by further excitation to the final fluorescing state due to energy transfer from a sensitizer. While this depiction is valid, the more strongly contributing process is the sequential excitation of the activator by two or more different sensitizer ions.

The upconversion process is said to be cooperative when there are one or more elementary steps (sensitization or luminescence) in the process which involve multiple lanthanide ions. In cooperative sensitization process, two ions in their excited state simultaneously decay to their ground states, generating a higher energy photon. Similarly, in cooperative luminescence, two excited state ions transfer their energy to a neighboring ion in one elementary step.

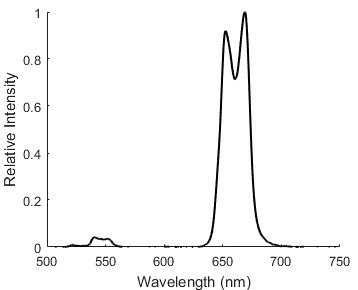
Luminescence spectra of cubic NaYF_{4}:Yb,Er upconversion nanoparticles illuminated at 980 nm.

Energy migration-mediated upconversion (EMU) involves four types of luminescent ion centers with different roles. They are located in separate layers of a core-shell structure of the nanomaterial to inhibit relaxation processes between ions. In this case, low-energy photons are excited in an ETU process that populates an excited state of another ion. Energy from this state can transfer to an adjacent ion through a core-shell interface and is then emitted.

Recently, moving forward in the challenge of designing particles with tunable emissions, important progress in synthesis of high-quality nano-structured crystals has enabled new pathways for photon upconversion. This includes the possibility of creating particles with core/shell structures, allowing upconversion through interfacial energy transfer (IET), upon which the interactions between typical lanthanide donor-acceptor pairs including Yb-Er, Yb-Tm, Yb-Ho, Gd-Tb, Gd-Eu and Nd-Yb can be precisely controlled on the nanoscale.

Photon avalanche occurs under conditions of a high ESA/GSA ratio and efficient cross-relaxation (CR). Ions, typically Tm^{3+}, Pr^{3+}, Nd^{3+}, initially in the ground state weakly absorb energy from the excitation source. This ground-state absorption (GSA) raises the ions to intermediate excited states. The excited-state ions absorb the energy more strongly than the ground-state ions. Highly excited ions undergo CR with neighboring ground-state ions, producing two ions in intermediate excited states. Further cycles of ESA and CR exponentially increase the number of intermediate excited ions. They eventually relax back to the ground state, emitting a large number of photons. Such systems with high nonlinearity exhibit a steep increase in emission intensity with increasing excitation power.

The mechanism for photon upconversion in lanthanide-doped nanoparticles is essentially the same as in bulk material, but some surface and size-related effects have been shown to have important consequences. While quantum confinement is not expected to have an effect on the energy levels in lanthanide ions since the 4f electrons are sufficiently localized, other effects have been shown to have important consequences on emission spectra and efficiency of UCNPs. Radiative relaxation is in competition with non-radiative relaxation, so phonon density of states becomes an important factor. In addition, phonon-assisted processes are important in bringing the energy states of the f orbitals in range so that energy transfer can occur. In nanocrystals, low frequency phonons do not occur in the spectrum, so the phonon band becomes a discrete set of states. With non-radiative relaxation decreasing the lifetimes of excited states and phonon-assistance increasing the probability of energy transfer, the effects of size are complicated because these effects compete with one another. Surface-related effects can also have a large influence on luminescence color and efficiency. Surface ligands on nanocrystals can have large vibrational energy levels, which can significantly contribute to phonon-assisted effects.

Lanthanide-doped upconversion nanocrystals have found broad applications across various fields. However, their low conversion efficiency remains a significant challenge. In recent decades, researchers have developed innovative solutions to synthesize upconversion nanocrystals with greatly improved efficiency. One frequently used approach is surface passivation, which aims to reduce quenching from surface impurities, ligands, and solvent molecules through multiphonon relaxation. Additionally, techniques such as organic dye sensitization, surface plasmon coupling, dielectric superlensing modulation, and resonant dielectric metasurface modulation have been widely employed for nanophotonic control. These techniques play a crucial role in enhancing upconversion luminescence, contributing to the overall improvement in efficiency.

== Chemistry ==
The chemical composition of upconverting nanoparticles, UCNPs, directly influences their conversion efficiency and spectral characteristics. Primarily, three compositional parameters influence the particles' performance: the host lattice, activator ions, and sensitizer ions.

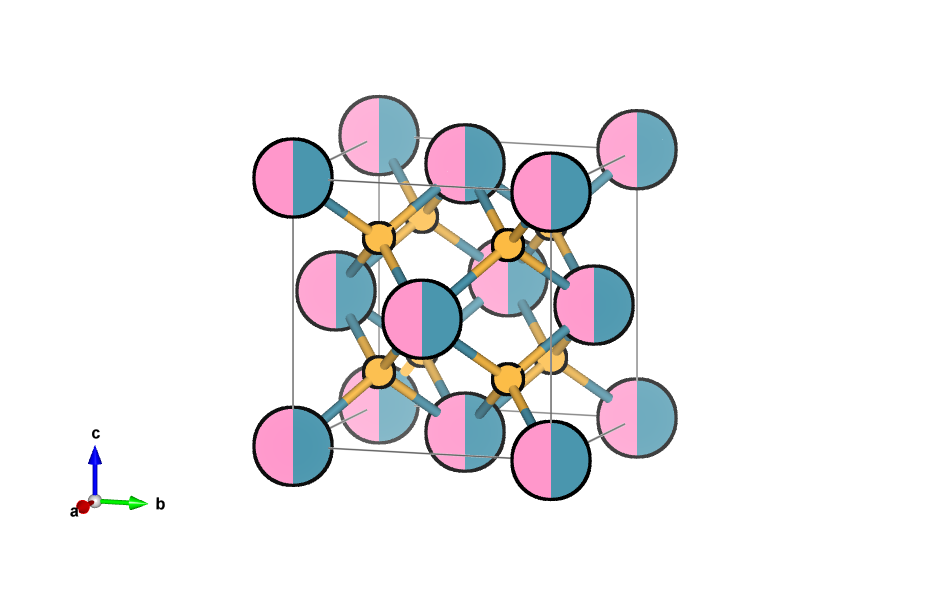
The NaYF_{4}:RE cubic unit cell. Key: Na (Teal), rare-earth element (RE, pink), and F (yellow). The spaces labelled with two colors can be occupied by either Na or RE elements.

The host lattice provides structure for both the activator and sensitizer ions and acts as a medium that conducts energy transfer. This host lattice has to satisfy three requirements: low lattice phonon energies, high chemical stability, and low symmetry of the lattice. The major mechanism responsible for reduced upconversion is nonradiative phonon relaxation. Generally, if large numbers of phonons are needed to convert excitation energy into phonon energy, the efficiency of the nonradiative process is lowered. Low phonon energies in the host lattice prevent this loss, improving the conversion efficiency of incorporated activator ions. The lattice must also be stable under chemical and photochemical conditions, as these are the environments the conversion will take place within. Finally, this host lattice ought to have low symmetry, allowing for a slight relaxation of the Laporte selection rules. The normally forbidden transitions lead to an increase in the f-f intermixing and thus enhancement of the upconversion efficiency.

Other considerations about the host lattice include choice of cation and anions. Importantly, cations should have similar radii to the intended dopant ions: For example, when using lanthanide dopant ions, certain alkaline-earth (Ca^{2+}), rare-earth (Y^{+}), and transition-metal ions (Zr^{4+}) all fulfill this requirement, as well as Na^{+}. Similarly, the choice of anion is important as it significantly affects the phonon energies and chemical stability. Heavy halides like Cl^{−} and Br^{−} have the lowest phonon energies and so are the least likely to promote nonradiative decay pathways. However, these compounds are generally hygroscopic and thus not suitably stable. Oxides on the other hand can be quite stable but have high phonon energies. Fluorides provide a balance between the two, having both stability and suitably low phonon energies. As such, it is evident why some of the most popular and efficient UCNP compositions are NaYF_{4}:Yb/Er and NaYF_{4}:Yb/Tm.

Choice of activator dopant ions is influenced by comparing relative energy levels: The energy difference between the ground state and the intermediate state should be similar to the difference between the intermediate state and the excited emission state. This minimizes non-radiative energy loss and facilitates both absorption and energy transfer. Generally, UCNPs contain some combination of rare-earth elements (Y, Sc, and the lanthanides), such as Er^{3+}, Tm^{3+}, and Ho^{3+} ions, since they have several levels that follow this "ladder" pattern especially well.

Lanthanide dopants are used as activator ions because they have multiple 4f excitation levels and completely filled 5s and 5p shells, which shield their characteristic 4f electrons, thus producing sharp f-f transition bands. These transitions provide substantially longer lasting excited states, since they are Laporte forbidden, thus allowing longer time necessary for the multiple excitations required for upconversion.

The concentration of activator ions in UCNPs is also critically important, as this determines the average distance between the activator ions and therefore affects how easily energy is exchanged. If the concentration of activators is too high and energy transfer too facile, cross-relaxation may occur, reducing emission efficiency.

Efficiency of UCNPs doped with only activators is usually low, due to their low absorption cross section and necessarily low concentration. Sensitizer ions are doped into the host lattice along with the activator ions in UCNPs to facilitate Electron Transfer Upconversion. The most commonly used sensitizer ion is trivalent Yb^{3+}. This ion provides a much larger absorption cross-section for incoming near-IR radiation, while only displaying a single excited 4f state. And since the energy gap between the ground level and this excited state matches well with the "ladder" gaps in the common activator ions, resonant energy transfers between the two dopant types.

Typical UCNPs are doped with approximately 20 mol% sensitizer ions and less than 2 mol% activator ions. These concentrations allow adequate distance between activators, avoiding cross-relaxation, and still absorb enough excitation radiation through the sensitizers to be efficient. Currently, other types of sensitizers are being developed to increase the spectral range available for upconversion, such as semi-conductor nanocrystal-organic ligand hybrids.

=== Synthesis ===
UCNP synthesis focuses on controlling several aspects of the nanoparticles – the size, shape, and phase. Control over each of these aspects may be achieved through different synthetic pathways, of which co-precipitation, hydro(solvo)thermal, and thermolysis are the most common. Different synthetic methods have different advantages and disadvantages, and the choice of synthesis must balance simplicity/ease of process, cost, and ability to achieve desired morphologies. Generally, solid-state synthesis techniques are the easiest for controlling the composition of the nanoparticles, but not the size or surface chemistry. Liquid-based syntheses are efficient and typically better for the environment.

The simplest and most economical method, in which components of the nanocrystal are mixed together in solution and allowed to precipitate. This method yields nanoparticles with a narrow size distribution (around 100 nm), but that lack the precision of more intricate methods, thereby requiring more post-synthesis work up. NPs can be improved with an annealing step at high temperatures, but this often leads to aggregation, limiting applications. Common coprecipitation synthesized NPs include rare-earth-doped NaYF_{4} nanoparticles prepared in the presence of ethylenediaminetetraacetic acid (EDTA) and LaYbEr prepared in NaF and organic phosphates (capping ligands).

Hydro(solvo)thermal, also known as hydrothermal/solvothermal, methods are implemented in sealed containers at higher temperatures and pressures in an autoclave. This method allows precise control over shape and size (monodisperse), but at the cost of long synthesis times and the inability to observe growth in real-time. More specialized techniques include sol-gel processing (hydrolysis and polycondensation of metal alkoxides), and combustion (flame) synthesis, which are rapid, non-solution phase pathways. Efforts to develop water-soluble and "green" total syntheses are also being explored, with the first of these methods implementing polyethylenimine (PEI)-coated nanoparticles.

Thermal decomposition uses high temperature solvents to decompose molecular precursors into nuclei, which grow at roughly the same rate, yielding high quality, monodisperse NPs. Growth is guided by precursor decomposition kinetics and Oswald ripening, allowing for fine control over particle size, shape and structure by temperature and reactant addition and identity.

=== Molecular mass ===
For many chemical and biological applications, it is useful to quantify the concentration of upconversion nanoparticles in terms of molecular mass. For this purpose, each nanoparticle can be considered a macromolecule. To calculate the molecular mass of a nanoparticle, the size of the nanoparticle, the size and shape of the unit cell structure, and the unit cell elemental composition must be known. These parameters can be obtained from transmission electron microscopy and X-ray diffraction respectively. From this, the number of unit cells in a nanoparticle, and thus the total mass of the nanoparticle, can be estimated.

=== Post-synthetic modification ===
As the size of the crystal decreases, the ratio of the surface area to volume increases dramatically, exposing dopant ions to being quenched due to effects of surface impurities, ligands, and solvents. Therefore, nano-sized particles are inferior to their bulk counterparts in upconversion efficiency. Experimental investigation reveals the dominant role of ligand in non-radiative relaxation process. There are several ways to increase the efficiencies of upconverting nanoparticles. This includes shell growth, ligand exchange and bilayer formation.

It has been shown that the introduction of an inert shell of a crystalline material around each doped NP serves as an effective way to isolate the core from the surrounding and surface deactivators, thus increasing upconverting efficiency. For example, 8 nm NaYF_{4} Yb^{3+}/Tm^{3+} UCNPs coated with a 1.5 nm thick NaYF_{4} shell, show 30-fold enhancement of the upconverting luminescence. The shell can be grown epitaxially using two general approaches: i) using molecular precursors; ii) using sacrificial particles (see Ostwald ripening). Moreover, a critical thickness of the shell for the emission enhancement may exist that serves as a design factor.

The molecular precursor of the shell material is mixed with the core particles in high-boiling solvents such as oleic acid and octadecene and the resultant mixture is heated to 300 °C to decompose the shell precursor. The shell tends to grow epitaxially on the core particles. Since the host matrix of the core and the shell are of similar chemical composition (to achieve uniform epitaxial growth), there is no contrast difference between the corresponding TEM images before and after the shell growth. Consequently, the possibility of the alloy instead of the core–shell formation cannot be easily excluded. However, it is possible to distinguish between the two scenarios using X-ray photoelectron spectroscopy (XPS).

=== Ligand exchange ===
As-synthesized UCNPs are usually capped with organic ligands that aid in size and shape control during preparation. These ligands make their surface hydrophobic and hence are not dispersible in aqueous solution, preventing their biological applications. One simple method to increase solubility in aqueous solvents is direct ligand exchange. This requires a more favored ligand to replace the initial ones. The hydrophobic native ligand capping the NP during synthesis (usually a long chain molecule like oleic acid) is directly substituted with a more polar hydrophilic one, which are usually multi-chelating (e.g. polyethylene glycol (PEG)-phosphate, polyacrylic acid) and hence provides better stabilization and binding, resulting in their exchange. A shortcoming of this method is the slow kinetics associated with the exchange. Generally the new ligand is also functionalized with a group like thiol that allows for facile binding to the NP surface. The protocol for direct exchange is simple, generally involving mixing for an extended period of time, but the work-up can be tedious, conditions must be optimized for each system, and aggregation may occur. However the two-step process of ligand exchange involves the removal of original ligands followed by coating hydrophilic ones, which is a better method. The ligand removal step here was reported through various ways. A simple way was wash the particles with ethanol under ultrasonic treatment. Reagents like nitrosonium tetrafluoroborate or acids are used to strip the native ligands off of the NP surface to attach favorable ones later on. This method shows less tendency for NP aggregation than the direct exchange, and can be generalized to other types of nanoparticles.

=== Formation of bilayer ===
Another method involves coating the UCNP in long amphiphilic alkyl chains to create a pseudo bilayer. The hydrophobic tails of the amphiphiles are inserted in between the oleate ligands on the surface of the NP, leaving the hydrophilic heads to face outwards. Phospholipids have been used for this purpose with great success, as they are readily engulfed by biological cells Using this strategy, surface charge is easily controlled by choosing the second layer and some functionalized molecules can be loaded to the outer layer. Both surface charge and surface functional groups are important in bioactivity of nanoparticles. A cheaper strategy for making lipid bilayer coating is to use amphiphilic polymers instead of amphiphilic molecules.

== Applications ==
=== Bioimaging ===
Bioimaging with UCNPs involves using a laser to excite the UCNPs within a sample and then detecting the emitted, frequency-doubled light. UCNPs are advantageous for imaging due to their narrow emission spectra, high chemical stability, low toxicity, weak autofluorescence background, long luminescence lifetime, and high resistance to photoquenching and photobleaching. In comparison to traditional biolabels, which use Stokes-shift processes and require high photon energies, UCNPs utilize an anti-Stokes mechanism that allows for the use of lower energy, less damaging and more deeply penetrating light. Multimodal imaging agents combine multiple modes of signal reporting. UCNPs with Gd^{3+} or Fe_{2}O_{3} can serve as luminescent probes and MRI contrast agents. UCNPs are also used in the configuration of photoluminescence and X-ray computed tomography (CT), and trimodal UCNPs combining photoluminescence, X-ray CT, and MRI have also been prepared. By taking advantage of the attractive interaction between fluoride and lanthanide ions, UCNPs can be used as imaging agents based on single-photon emission computed tomography (SPECT), helping to image lymph nodes and to assist in staging for cancer surgery. UCNPs as targeted fluorophores and conjugated with ligands form over-expressed receptors on malignant cells, serving as a photoluminescence label to selectively image cells. UCNPs have also been used in functional imaging, such as the targeting of lymph nodes and the vascular system to assist in cancer surgeries. UCNPs enable multiplexed imaging by dopant modulation, shifting emission peaks to wavelengths that can be resolved. Single-band UCNPs conjugated to antibodies are used in detecting breast cancer cells, surpassing traditional fluorophore labeling of antibodies, which is not amenable to multiplexed analysis.

=== Biosensors and temperature sensors ===
It is utilizing photoinduced electron transfer mechanism. UCNPs have been used as nanothermometers to detect intracellular temperature differences. (NaYF_{4}: 20% Yb^{3+}, 2% Er^{3+}) @NaYF_{4} core–shell structured hexagonal nanoparticles can measure temperatures in the physiological range (25 °C to 45 °C) with less than 0.5 °C precision in HeLa cells. UNCPs can be made much more versatile biosensors by combining them with recognition elements like enzymes or antibodies. Intracellular glutathione was detected using UCNPs modified with MnO_{2} nanosheets. MnO_{2} nanosheets quench UCNP luminescence, and glutathione was observed to selectively restore this luminescence through reduction of MnO_{2} to Mn^{2+}. NaYF_{4}: Yb^{3+}/Tm^{3+} nanoparticles with SYBR Green I dye can probe Hg^{2+} in vitro with a detection limit of 0.06 nM. Hg^{2+} and other heavy metals have been measured in live cells. The tunable and multiplexed emissions allow for the simultaneous detection of different species.

=== Drug release and delivery ===
There are three ways to construct UCNP-based drug delivery systems. First, UCNPs can transport hydrophobic drugs, like doxorubicin, by encapsulating them on the particle surface, the hydrophobic pocket. The drug can be released by a pH change. Second, mesoporous silica coated UCNPs can be used, where drugs can be stored and released from the porous surface. Thirdly, the drug can be encapsulated and transferred in a hollow UCNP shell.

Light-activated processes that deliver or activate medicine are known as photodynamic therapeutic (PDT). Many photoactive compounds, are triggered by UV light, which has smaller penetration depth and causes more tissue damage compared with IR light. UCNPs can be used to locally trigger UV-activated compounds when irradiated with benign IR irradiation. For instance, UCNPs can absorb IR light and emit visible light to trigger a photosensitizer, which can produce highly reactive singlet oxygen to destroy tumor cells. This non-toxic and effective approach has been demonstrated both in vitro and in vivo. Similarly, UCNPs can be used in photothermal therapy, which destroys targets by heat. In UCNP-plasmonic nanoparticle composites (e.g. NaYF_{4}:Yb Er@Fe_{3}O_{4}@Au_{17}), the UCNPs target tumor cells and the plasmonic nanoparticles generate heat to kill cancer cells. [Field] nanoparticles generate heat to kill cancer cells.

=== Solar Cells ===
UCNPs have been integrated into solar panels to broaden the spectrum of sunlight that can be captured and converted into electricity. The maximum output of a solar cell is dictated in part by the fraction of incident photons captured to promote electrons. Solar cells can only absorb and convert photons with energy equal to or greater than the bandgap. Any incident photon with energy smaller than the bandgap is lost. For an ideal single-junction solar cell with a bandgap of 1.34 eV, only 33.17% of incident sunlight can be absorbed, also known as the Shockley–Queisser limit. UCNPs can capture this wasted sunlight by combining multiple low energy IR photons into a single high energy photon. The emitted photon will have sufficient energy to promote charge carriers across the band gap. UCNPs can be integrated into solar cell systems of a number of different classes and in multiple forms. For example, UCNPs can be laminated onto the back sides of semiconductors as a film, to collect low energy light and upconvert it. Such a treatment generated a 37% efficiency for upconverted light. Another strategy is to disperse the nanoparticles throughout a highly porous material. In one device architecture, UCNPs are infiltrated into a titania micro-scaffold. More titania is added to embed the UCNPs, UCNPs have also been used in dye-sensitized cells. Additionally, UCNPs can be utilized in perovskite solar cells (PSCs) to significantly enhance their efficiency.

There are various UCNP parameters that need to be controlled to optimize solar cell performance. To optimize the UCNPs' solar efficiency enhancement, it is crucial to regulate the size and shape of the nanoparticles, the dopant and host lattice identity, and the concentration of dopants. The host lattice needs to be chemically robust enough to withstand synthesis. The system parameters that affect these UCNP properties include temperature, pressure, capping ligand, precursor composition, heating rate, cooling rate, reaction time, solvent, and reagent concentrations. To commercialize UCNP applications in solar cells, their synthesis needs to be scalable. Although various UCNP structures are optimal for different applications, for solar cells, one of the most suitable and scalable UCNP structures is core-shell nanoparticles. Commonly, nanoparticle synthesis is upscaled using flow reactors, microfluidics, or batch production. However, for the more precise synthesis methods, namely hydro(solvo)thermal and thermolysis, a temperature greater than 300℃ is required, making flow reactors and microfluidics incompatible for high-quality large-scale UCNP synthesis. Thus, batch producing core-shell nanoparticles to synthesize functional UCNPs at a large scale for solar cell applications is the most optimal method.

=== Super-resolution imaging ===
Lanthanide-doped upconversion nanocrystals have indeed emerged as promising alternatives to traditional super-resolution imaging probes like organic dyes and quantum dots, primarily due to their high photostability and unique nonlinear optical processes. For example, upconversion nanocrystals have been utilized to achieve high-resolution imaging in STED microscopy. This technique involves exciting the fluorescent probe with an excitation laser, followed by de-excitation through stimulated emission using a depletion laser. By using a doughnut-shaped depletion laser, the point spread function (PSF) is effectively compressed, overcoming the diffraction barrier and enabling super-resolution imaging.

Additionally, the exploration of photon avalanche materials with ultrahigh nonlinearity for single-beam super-resolution imaging further highlights the potential of these advanced nanomaterials in pushing the boundaries of optical imaging techniques. The unique properties of upconversion nanocrystals allow for the realization of super-resolution imaging with sub-70-nm spatial resolution, achieved through simple scanning confocal microscopy without the need for complex computational analysis.

=== Upconversion lasing ===
In contrast to organic molecules and quantum dots, lanthanide ions exhibit complex excited states and significantly longer luminescence lifetimes. This characteristic makes it easier to achieve population inversion, a crucial requirement for lasing, when using lanthanide-activated gain materials. Miniaturized lasers are employed as a platform for producing coherent light for various sensing and imaging applications. Lanthanide-doped upconversion nanocrystals have been effectively utilized to achieve UV-to-NIR lasing within microcavities. Remarkably, this is achieved with a pumping threshold below 100 W cm^-2 using a continuous wave (CW) pumping laser source at room temperature.

=== Upconversion optogenetics ===
Membrane ion channels play a crucial role in various biological systems by facilitating the propagation and integration of electrical signals. Upconversion nanocrystals have emerged as nano-illuminators capable of controlling the activity of specific membrane ion channels. This capability is particularly valuable for in vivo applications, where the low attenuation of near-infrared (NIR) light in biological tissues enables precise and minimally invasive control of ion channel activity. One application involves embedding upconversion nanocrystals with strong blue emission into polymeric scaffolds. This approach enables optogenetic control of neuron cell activities on the scaffold surface when excited with 980-nm NIR light. Moreover, the utilization of upconversion nanocrystal-mediated optogenetics has enabled the stimulation of deep-brain neurons in mouse brains. This technique has been proven effective in eliciting dopamine release from genetically modified neurons and inducing brain oscillations through the activation of inhibitory neurons. Furthermore, upconversion optogenetics has shown promise in suppressing seizures by inhibiting excitatory cells in the hippocampus and in eliciting memory recall.

=== Mid-infrared detection ===
When exposed to MIR radiation, the lanthanide nanotransducers' emission band intensity ratio can be modulated. This modulation converts MIR radiation to the visible (VIS) and near-infrared (NIR) regions, allowing for real-time detection and imaging using silicon photodetectors.

=== Photoswitching ===
Photoswitching is the conversion from one chemical isomer to another triggered by light. Photoswitching finds use in optical data processing and storage and in photorelease. Photorelease is the use of light to induce a moiety attached to the nanoparticle surface to detach. UCNPs of lanthanide-doped NaYF_{4} have been applied as remote control photoswitches. UCNPs are useful photoswitches because they can be irradiated with low-cost NIR radiation and convert it into UV radiation extremely locally. Photocatalytic systems can be enhanced with UCNPs by the same principle as solar cells. In titania coated with YF_{3}:Yb/Tm UCNPs, degradation of pollutants was observed under NIR radiation. Normally low-energy NIR radiation cannot induce photocatalysis in titania, which has a band gap in the UV range. The excitation in titania results in a surface redox reaction which decomposes compounds near the surface. UCNPs enable cheap low-energy NIR photons to replace expensive UV photons. In biological contexts UV light is highly absorbed and causes tissue damage. However NIR is weakly absorbed and induces UCNP behavior in vivo. Core-shell UCNPs were used to initiate the photocleavage of a ruthenium complex using an intensity of NIR light that is completely safe in biomedical use.

UCNP-based systems can couple both light-based techniques and current-based techniques. This optical stimulation of semiconductors is then coupled with voltage-based stimulation in order to store information. Other advantages of utilizing UCNPs for flash drives include that all materials employed are photo- and thermally stable. Furthermore, imperfections in the UCNP film will not affect data storage. These advantages yielded an impressive achieved storage limit, making UCNP films a promising material in optical storage. UCNPs can be applied in niche applications for displays and printing. Anti-counterfeiting codes or prints can be fabricated using UCNPs in existing colloidal ink preparations. Flexible, transparent displays have also been fabricated using UCNPs. New security inks which incorporate lanthanide doped upconverting nanoparticles have many advantages. Also, these inks are invisible until subjected to NIR light. Red, green and blue upconverting inks have been achieved. The color produced from some overlapped ink depends on the power density of the NIR excitation, which enables the incorporation of additional security features.

The use of upconverting nanoparticles in fingerprinting is highly selective. The upconverting nanoparticles can bind to lysozyme in sweat that is deposited when a fingertip touches a surface. Also, a cocaine-specific aptamer is developed to identify cocaine-laced fingerprints by the same method. Upconverting nanoparticles can also be used for barcoding. These micro-barcodes can be embedded onto various objects. The barcodes are seen under NIR illumination and can be imaged using an iPhone camera and a microscope objective.
