= Jacques-Edouard Moser =

Swiss chemist (born 1958)

Jacques-E. Moser
- Born: 23 June 1958 (age 68) in Yverdon-les-Bains
- Citizenship: Swiss, from Röthenbach im Emmental
- Education: École Polytechnique Fédérale de Lausanne
- Known for: Research on the dynamics of photoinduced electron transfer and charge separation in emergent photovoltaics
- Scientific career
- Fields: Physical chemistry, ultrafast laser spectroscopy, photochemistry, photovoltaics
- Workplaces: École Polytechnique Fédérale de Lausanne; Eastman Kodak
- Website: https://gdp.epfl.ch

Jacques-Edouard Moser (born 23 June 1958) is a Swiss physical chemist and professor of photochemistry at the Institute of Chemical Sciences and Engineering of the École Polytechnique Fédérale de Lausanne (EPFL) in Switzerland. He is best known for his research on the dynamics of photoinduced electron transfer and charge separation in systems for solar energy conversion.

== Education ==
Moser studied chemistry and chemical engineering at EPFL. He graduated as a qualified chemical engineer (Ing.-chim. dipl. EPFL) in 1982 and earned his PhD (Dr ès sc.) in physical chemistry in 1986 for his thesis carried out under the supervision of Michael Grätzel. In 1984 and 1985, he was a visiting student researcher at the Canadian Centre for Picosecond Laser Flash Photolysis at Concordia University in Montreal (Canada).

== Career and research ==
Moser conducted postdoctoral research at the Eastman Kodak Corporate Research Laboratories in Rochester (New York) in the group of Samir Farid from 1986 to 1988. Back to EPFL, he was appointed a lecturer and established a research group in photochemistry in 1992. He was awarded the habilitation and the venia legendi in 1998. In 2005, he became a titular professor and head of the Photochemical Dynamics Group (Moser Group).

Following his retirement in 2023, Jacques-Edouard Moser became professor emeritus at the School of Basic Sciences while still teaching photochemistry to graduate MSc and PhD students.

From 1995 to 1998, Moser was president of the Swiss Society of Photochemistry and Photophysics (SGPP) and from 2005 to 2012 a member of the board of directors of the Swiss Chemical Society (SCG). He served as director of the Section of Chemistry and Chemical Engineering of EPFL from 2007 to 2015. He is a member of the advisory editorial board of the journal Chemical Physics Letters and of the Committee of the Société Vaudoise des Sciences Naturelles (SVSN).

The work of Jacques-Edouard Moser uses ultrafast laser spectroscopy to reveal how light-induced electrical charges separate and transfer at nanostructured interfaces. Results allow for a better understanding of the processes taking place in third-generation photovoltaic cells and for further developments. The systems under investigation include dye-sensitized solar cells (DSCs), polymer- and small-molecule-based organic photovoltaics (OPV), and hybrid organic–inorganic perovskite solar cells. Moser is the author and co-author of 250 refereed articles that received more than 52,000 citations.

Jacques-Edouard Moser has collaborated extensively with Michael Grätzel at EPFL, contributing time-resolved investigations and landmark joint publications. His research group has developed and applied specific investigation methods to address scientific questions related to photonic materials and systems close to working conditions.

From 2010 to 2022, he was one of the principal investigators of the NCCR MUST (National Center of Competence in Research – Molecular Ultrafast Science and Technology) consortium. His later research has examined charge-transfer states and exciton dissociation in two-dimensional perovskites and quantum confined semiconductor nanoparticles.

== Awards and honours ==
In 1988, Moser received the Latsis University Prize for his early work in photochemistry and charge-transfer dynamics. In 2015, EPFL awarded him the Medal of Excellence in Teaching for his commitment to education in general chemistry and photochemistry. In 2023, he was conferred the title of honorary professor of EPFL.

== Notable publications ==
- Moser, J.; Grätzel, M. (1984). "Photosensitized electron injection in colloidal semiconductors". Journal of the American Chemical Society. 106 (22): 6557–6564. Bibcode:1984JAChS.106.6557M. doi:10.1021/ja00334a017. PDF.
- Moser, J.-E.; Wolf, M.; Lenzmann, F.; Grätzel, M. (1999). "Photoinduced charge injection from vibronically hot excited molecules of a dye sensitizer into acceptor states of wide-bandgap oxide semiconductors". Zeitshrift für Physikalische Chemie. 212 (1):85-92. doi:10.1524/zpch.1999.212.Part_1.085. PDF.
- Grätzel, M.; Moser, J.-E. (2001). "Solar energy conversion". In Balzani, V. (ed.). Electron Transfer in Chemistry (Vol. 5). Weinheim: Wiley-VCH. pp. 588-644. doi:10.1002/9783527618248. PDF
- Moser, Jacques-E. (3 August 2010). "Dynamics of interfacial and surface electron transfer processes". In Kalyanasundaram, K. (ed.). Dye-Sensitized Solar Cells (1st ed.). Lausanne: EPFL Press. pp. 403–456. doi:10.1201/b16409. ISBN 9780429156359. PDF.
- Thorsmølle, V. K.; Rothenberger, G.; Topgaard, D.; Brauer, J. C.; Kuang, D.-B.; Zakeeruddin, S. M.; Lindman, B.; Grätzel, M.; Moser, J.-E. (2011). "Extraordinarly efficient conduction in a redox-active ionic liquid". ChemPhysChem. 12:145-149. doi:10.1002/cphc.201000819. PDF.
- Marchioro, A.; Teuscher, J.; Friederich, D.; Kunst, M.; Van de Kroll, R.; Moehl, T.; Grätzel, M.; Moser, J.-E. (2014). "Unravelling the mechanism of photoinduced charge transfer processes in lead iodide perovskite solar cells". Nature Photonics. 8 (3): 250–255. Bibcode:2014NaPho...8..250M. doi:10.1038/nphoton.2013.374. PDF.
- Bouduban, M. E. F.; Burgos-Caminal, A.; Ossola, R.; Teuscher, J.; Moser, J.-E. (2017)."Energy and charge transfer cascade in methylammonium lead bromide perovskite nanoparticle aggregates". Chemical Science. 8 (6): 4371-4380. doi:10.1039/c6sc05211h. PDF.
- Teuscher, J.; Brauer, J. C.; Stepanov, A.; Solano, A.; Boziki, A.; Chergui, M.; Wolf, J.-P.; Rothlisberger, U.; Banerji, N.; Moser, J.-E. (2017). "Charge separation and carrier dynamics in donor-acceptor heterojunction photovoltaic systems". Structural Dynamics. 4 (6): 061503. doi:10.1063/1.4996409. PDF.
- Kim, S. G.; Fish, G. C.; Socie, E.; Terpstra, A. T.; Park, D.-A.; Zhu, K.; Grätzel, M.; Moser, J.-E.; Park, N.-G. (2024), "Photo-doping of spiro-OMeTAD for highly stable and efficient perovskite solar cells". Joule. 8: 1707-1722. doi:10.1016/j.joule.2024.03.012. PDF.
