= Photoinduced electron transfer =

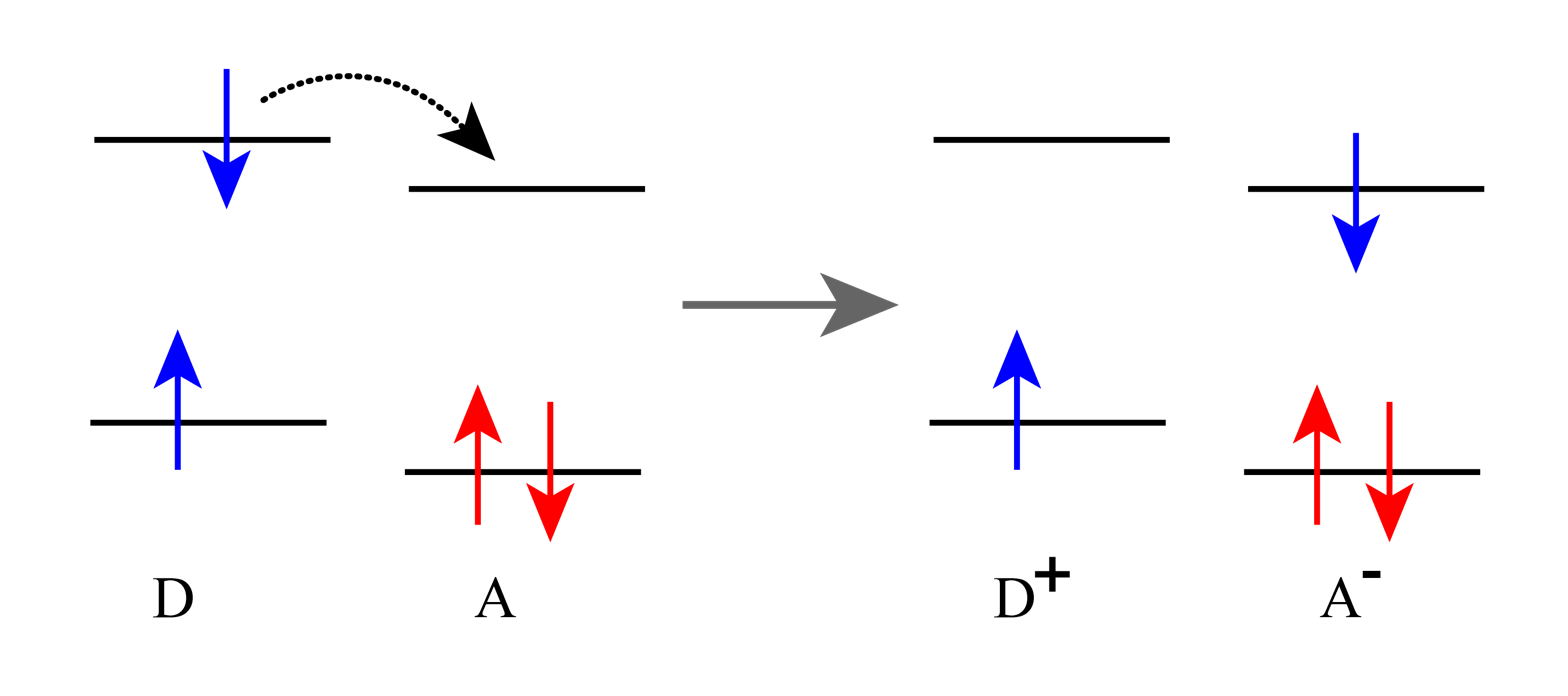
Schematic of photoinduced electron transfer process

Photoinduced electron transfer (PET) is an excited state electron transfer process by which an excited electron is transferred from donor to acceptor. Due to PET a charge separation is generated, i.e., redox reaction takes place in excited state (this phenomenon is not observed in Dexter electron transfer).

== Breadth ==
Such materials include semiconductors that can be photoactivated like many solar cells, biological systems such as those used in photosynthesis, and small molecules with suitable absorptions and redox states.

== Process ==
It is common to describe where electrons reside as electron bands in bulk materials and electron orbitals in molecules. For the sake of expedience the following description will be described in molecular terms. When a photon excites a molecule, an electron in a ground state orbital can be excited to a higher energy orbital. This excited state leaves a vacancy in a ground state orbital that can be filled by an electron donor. It produces an electron in a high energy orbital which can be donated to an electron acceptor. In these respects a photoexcited molecule can act as a good oxidizing agent or a good reducing agent.

Photoinduced oxidation

[ML_{n}]^{2+} + hν → [ML_{n}]^{2+}*

[ML_{n}]^{2+}* + donor → [ML_{n}]^{+} + donor^{+}

Photoinduced reduction

[ML_{n}]^{2+} + hν → [ML_{n}]^{2+}*

[ML_{n}]^{2+}* + acceptor → [ML_{n}]^{3+} + acceptor^{−}

The end result of both reactions is that an electron is delivered to an orbital that is higher in energy than where it previously resided. This is often described as a charge separated electron-hole pair when working with semiconductors.

In the absence of a proper electron donor or acceptor it is possible for such molecules to undergo ordinary fluorescence emission. The electron transfer is one form of photoquenching.

== Subsequent processes ==
In many photo-productive systems this charge separation is kinetically isolated by delivery of the electron to a lower energy conductor attached to the p/n junction or into an electron transport chain. In this case some of the energy can be captured to do work. If the electron is not kinetically isolated thermodynamics will take over and the products will react with each other to regenerate the ground state starting material. This process is called recombination and the photon's energy is released as heat.

Recombination of photoinduced oxidation

[ML_{n}]^{+} + donor^{+} → [ML_{n}]^{2+} + donor

== Potential induced photon production ==
The reverse process to photoinduced electron transfer is displayed by light emitting diodes (LED) and chemiluminescence, where potential gradients are used to create excited states that decay by light emission.
