= Förster coupling =

Resonant energy transfer between excitons within adjacent QD's (quantum dots)

Förster coupling is the resonant energy transfer between excitons within adjacent QD's (quantum dots). The first studies of Forster were performed in the context of the sensitized luminescence of solids. Here, an excited sensitizer atom can transfer its excitation to a neighbouring acceptor atom, via an intermediate virtual photon. This same mechanism has also been shown to be responsible for exciton transfer between QD's and within molecular systems and biosystems (though incoherently, as a mechanism for photosynthesis), all of which may be treated in a similar formulation. (See also Förster resonance energy transfer (FRET).)

== Introduction ==
In the introductory lecture given by T. Förster, he considered the transfer of electronic excitation energy between otherwise well-separated atomic or molecular electronic systems, which exclude the trivial case of an excitation transfer that consists in the emission of one quantum of light by the first atom or molecule followed by re-absorption by the second one. It is only the non-radiative transfer of excitation occurring during the short lifetimes of excited electronic systems which he considered there.

The first observation of energy transfer was made by Cario and Franck (1922) in their classical experiments on sensitized fluorescence of atoms in the vapour phase. A mixture of mercury and thallium vapour, when irradiated with the light of the mercury resonance line, shows the emission spectra of both atoms. Since thallium atoms do not absorb the exciting light, they can get excited only indirectly by an excitation transfer from mercury atoms. A transfer by reabsorption is impossible here. Therefore, this transfer must be a non-radiative one with a mercury atom as the donor or sensitizer and the thallium atom as the acceptor. Unfortunately, in this case it cannot be decided whether the transfer occurs between distant atoms or during a normal collision or even in a labile molecule formed as an intermediate. This decision, however, was possible in similar cases, as in the mercury-sensitized fluorescence of sodium and in the mutual sensitization of the fluorescence of different mercury isotopes. In these cases, the transfer occurs over distances very much larger than those in normal collisional separations. Similar observations of sensitized fluorescence were made with molecular vapours and in solution.

Further experiments have shown that in this case the transfer occurs not over collisional distances but over the mean intermolecular distances of sensitizer and acceptor, corresponding to a concentration of 10^{−3} to 10^{−2} M. This is demonstrated by the fact that sensitization occurs with similar half-value concentrations in solution of very different viscosities and even in organic glasses at low temperature. The possibility of the formation of a complex between sensitizer and acceptor molecules was excluded by the additivity of the absorption spectra and the different dependence on concentration to be expected in this case. It must be concluded, therefore, that excitation transfer of a non-trivial nature occurs over the mean distances between statistically distributed molecules which are about 40Å in this case. It differs from short-distance collisional transfer by its independence of solvent viscosity and from transfer within a molecular complex by the constancy of absorption spectra and the decrease in sensitizer fluorescence lifetime.

== Qualitative features ==
Table 2 summarizes some qualitative features of this kind of long-range transfer and of some more or less trivial mechanisms. The non-trivial transfer differs from re-absorption transfer by its independence of the volume of the solution, by the decrease in sensitizer fluorescence lifetime, and by the invariability of the sensitizer fluorescence spectrum. It differs from short-distance collisional transfer by its independence of solvent viscosity and from transfer within a molecular complex by the constancy of absorption spectra and the decrease in sensitizer fluorescence lifetime. In most cases, some of these different properties allow a decision between trivial and non-trivial transfer mechanisms. Further discriminations may be made by quantitative studies of these properties.

== Coulomb interaction ==
The electrons interact via the Coulomb interaction, given by the Hamiltonian

$$H_c=\frac{1}{2}\sum _{i,j,k,l} V_{\text{ijkl}}a_i{}^{\dagger }a_j{}^{\dagger }a_la_k$$

where the Coulomb matrix element is given by

$$V_{\text{ijkl}}=\frac{e^2}{4\pi \epsilon _0\epsilon _r}\int d^3x\int d^3x'\phi _i{}^*\left(\overset{\rightharpoonup }{x}\right)\phi _j{}^*\left(\overset{\rightharpoonup }{x}'\right)\frac{1}{\left|\overset{\rightharpoonup }{x}-\overset{\rightharpoonup }{x}'\right|}\phi _k\left(\overset{\rightharpoonup }{x}\right)\phi _l\left(\overset{\rightharpoonup }{x}'\right)$$

Here, $\epsilon _r$ is the dielectric constant of the medium.

To calculate the dynamics of two coupled QDs (each modeled as an interband two-level system with one conduction and one valence level $|c\rangle$and $|v\rangle$, respectively) which have no electronic overlap, an expansion of the potential is performed: (i) a long-range expansion about a reference point of each QD, varying on a mesoscopic scale and neglecting the variation on the scale of the elementary cell - this yields level diagonal contributions in the Hamiltonian $H_{\text{cc}}=\sum _{i>j} V_{\text{cc}}^{\text{ij}}a_{c_i}{}^{\dagger }a_{c_j}{}^{\dagger }a_{c_j}a_{c_i}$ and $H_{\text{cv}}=\sum _{i\neq j} V_{\text{cv}}^{\text{ij}}a_{c_i}{}^{\dagger }a_{v_j}{}^{\dagger }a_{v_j}a_{c_i}$ ; and (ii) a short-range expansion about an arbitrary lattice vector, taking into account the microscopic variation of the QD - this yields nondiagonal contributions $H_F=\sum _{i\neq j} V_F^{\text{ij}}a_{c_i}{}^{\dagger }a_{v_j}{}^{\dagger }a_{c_j}a_{v_i}$ . On the dipole-dipole level, the level diagonal elements correspond to an electrostatic energetic shift of the system (biexcitonic shift $V_{\text{bs}}=V_{\text{cv}}-V_{\text{cc}}$), while the nondiagonal elements, the so-called Förster coupling elements $V_F$, correspond to an excitation transfer between the different QDs.

== Hamiltonian ==
Here, we shall consider excitons in two coupled QD's and the Coulomb interactions between them. More specifically, we shall derive an analytical expression for the strength of the inter-dot Foerster coupling. It can be also shown that this coupling is, under certain conditions, of dipole-dipole type and that it is responsible for resonant exciton exchange between adjacent QD's. This is a transfer of energy only, not a tunnelling effect.

we write the Hamiltonian of two interacting QD's in the computational basis $\{ |00 \rangle , |01 \rangle , |10 \rangle , |11\rangle \} \ as \ ( \hbar = 1)$

$\hat{H}=\left( \begin{array}{cccc} \omega _0 & 0 & 0 & 0 \\ 0 & \omega _0+\omega _2 & V_F & 0 \\ 0 & V_F & \omega _0+\omega _1 & 0 \\ 0 & 0 & 0 & \omega _0+\omega _1+\omega _2+V_{\text{XX}} \end{array} \right)$

where the off-diagonal Förster interaction is given by $V_F$ , and the direct Coulomb binding energy between the two excitons, one on each dot, is on the diagonal and given by $V_{\text{XX}}$ . The ground state energy is denoted by $\omega _0$ , and $\Delta \omega \equiv \omega _1 - \omega _2$ is the difference between the excitation energy for dot I and that for dot II. These excitation energies and inter-dot interactions are all functions of the applied field F.

It is also straightforward to see that an off-diagonal Förster coupling does indeed correspond to a resonant transfer of energy; if we begin in the state $|10 \rangle$ (exciton on dot I, no exciton on dot II) this will naturally evolve to a state $|01 \rangle$

== See also ==
- Semiconductors
