= Quenching (fluorescence) =

Reduction of light emitted from fluorescent substances

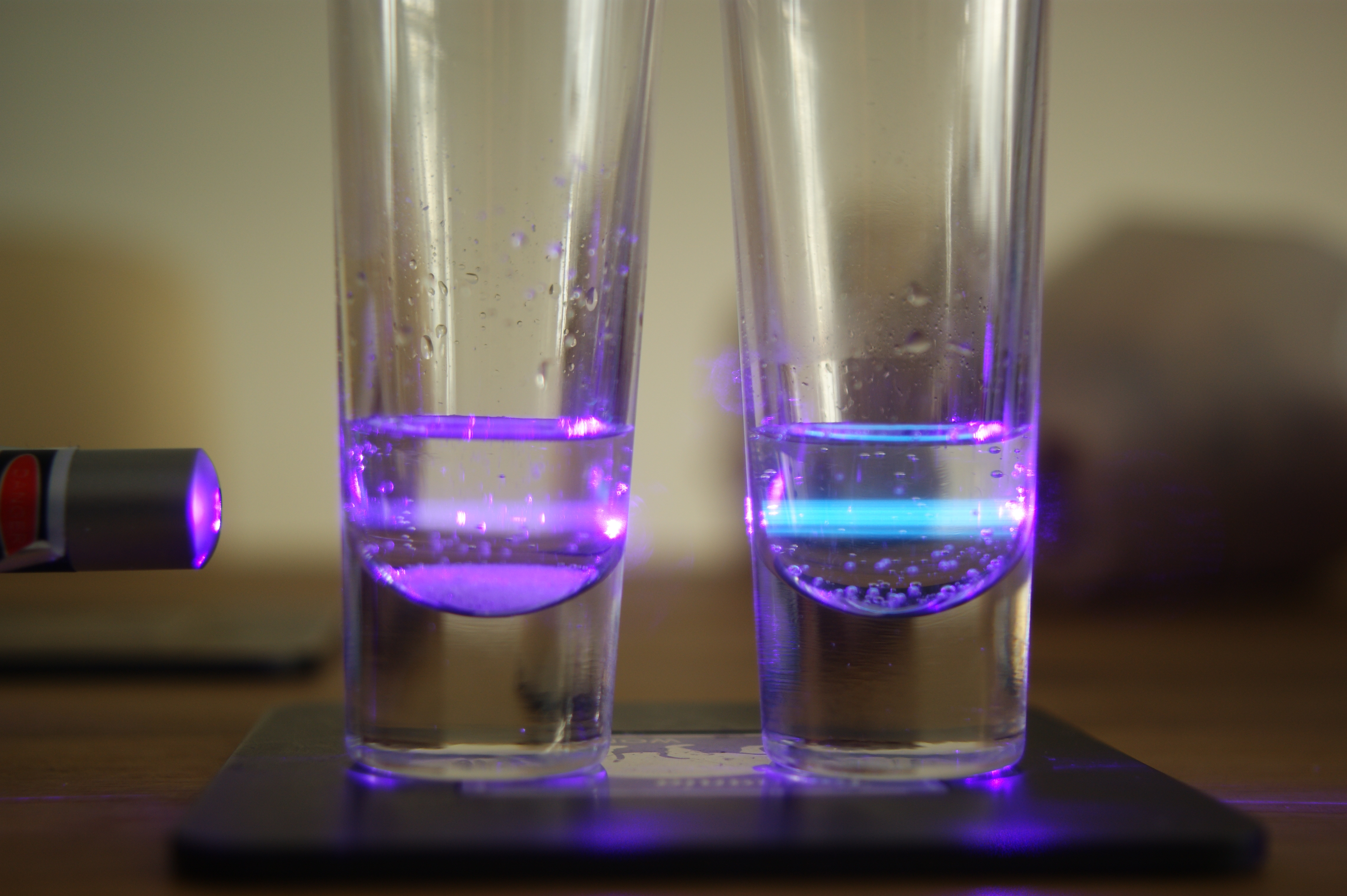
Two samples of quinine dissolved in water with a violet laser (left) illuminating both. Typically quinine fluoresces blue, which is visible in the right sample. The left sample contains chloride ions which quench quinine's fluorescence, so the left sample does not fluoresce visibly (the violet light is just scattered laser light).

In chemistry, quenching refers to any process which decreases the fluorescent intensity of a given substance. A variety of processes can result in quenching, such as excited state reactions, energy transfer, complex-formation and collisions. As a consequence, quenching is often heavily dependent on pressure and temperature. Molecular oxygen, iodine ions and acrylamide are common chemical quenchers. The chloride ion is a well known quencher for quinine fluorescence. Quenching poses a problem for non-instant spectroscopic methods, such as laser-induced fluorescence.

Quenching is made use of in optode sensors; for instance the quenching effect of oxygen on certain ruthenium complexes allows the measurement of oxygen saturation in solution. Quenching is the basis for Förster resonance energy transfer (FRET) assays. Quenching and dequenching upon interaction with a specific molecular biological target is the basis for activatable optical contrast agents for molecular imaging. Many dyes undergo self-quenching, which can decrease the brightness of protein-dye conjugates for fluorescence microscopy, or can be harnessed in sensors of proteolysis.

== Mechanisms ==
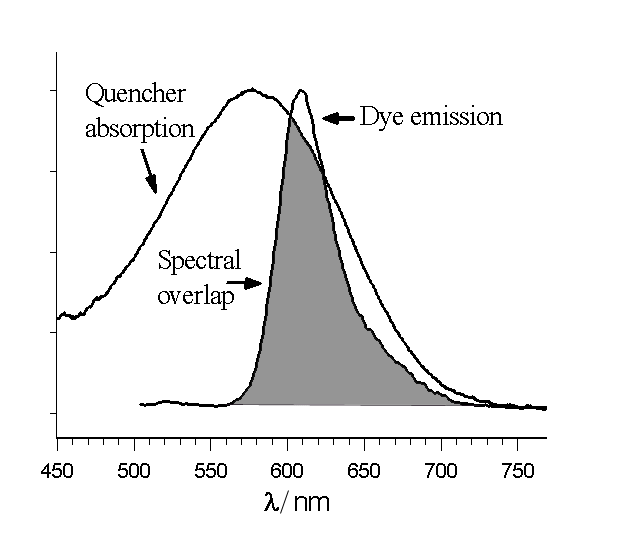
Donor emission and quencher absorption spectral overlap

=== Förster resonance energy transfer ===
There are a few distinct mechanisms by which energy can be transferred non-radiatively (without absorption or emission of photons) between two dyes, a donor and an acceptor. Förster resonance energy transfer (FRET or FET) is a dynamic quenching mechanism because energy transfer occurs while the donor is in the excited state. FRET is based on classical dipole-dipole interactions between the transition dipoles of the donor and acceptor and is extremely dependent on the donor-acceptor distance, R, falling off at a rate of 1/R^{6}. FRET also depends on the donor-acceptor spectral overlap (see figure) and the relative orientation of the donor and acceptor transition dipole moments. FRET can typically occur over distances up to 100 Å.

=== Dexter electron transfer ===
Dexter (also known as Dexter exchange or collisional energy transfer, colloquially known as Dexter Energy Transfer) is another dynamic quenching mechanism. Dexter electron transfer is a short-range phenomenon that falls off exponentially with distance (proportional to e^{−kR} where k is a constant that is the inverse of the sum of both van der Waals radius of the atom over 2) and depends on spatial overlap of donor and quencher molecular orbitals. In most donor-fluorophore–quencher-acceptor situations, the Förster mechanism is more important than the Dexter mechanism. With both Förster and Dexter energy transfer, the shapes of the absorption and fluorescence spectra of the dyes are unchanged.

Dexter electron transfer can be significant between the dye and the solvent especially when hydrogen bonds are formed between them.

=== Exciplex ===
Exciplex (excited state complex) formation is a third dynamic quenching mechanism.

Comparison of static and dynamic quenching mechanisms

=== Static quenching ===
The remaining energy transfer mechanism is static quenching (also referred to as contact quenching). Static quenching can be a dominant mechanism for some reporter-quencher probes. Unlike dynamic quenching, static quenching occurs when the molecules form a complex in the ground state, i.e. before excitation occurs. The complex has its own unique properties, such as being nonfluorescent and having a unique absorption spectrum. Dye aggregation is often due to hydrophobic effects—the dye molecules stack together to minimize contact with water. Planar aromatic dyes that are matched for association through hydrophobic forces can enhance static quenching. High temperatures and addition of surfactants tend to disrupt ground state complex formation.

=== Collisional quenching ===
Collisional quenching occurs when the excited fluorophore collides with an atom or molecule that can facilitate non-radiative transitions to the ground state.

== See also ==
- Dark quencher, for use in molecular biology.
- Förster resonance energy transfer, a phenomenon on which some quenching techniques rely
- Amplifying fluorescent polymer
- Fido explosives detector
