= Förster resonance energy transfer =

Photochemical energy transfer mechanism

Jablonski diagram of FRET with typical timescales indicated. The black dashed line indicates a virtual photon.

Förster resonance energy transfer (FRET), resonance energy transfer (RET) or electronic energy transfer (EET) is a mechanism describing energy transfer between two light-sensitive molecules (chromophores). A donor chromophore, initially in its electronic excited state, may transfer energy to an acceptor chromophore through nonradiative dipole–dipole coupling. The efficiency of this energy transfer is inversely proportional to the sixth power of the distance between donor and acceptor, making FRET extremely sensitive to small changes in distance.

Measurements of FRET efficiency can be used to determine if two fluorophores are within a certain distance of each other. Such measurements are used as a research tool in fields including biology and chemistry.

FRET is analogous to near-field communication, in that the radius of interaction is much smaller than the wavelength of light emitted. In the near-field region, the excited chromophore emits a virtual photon that is instantly absorbed by a receiving chromophore. These virtual photons are undetectable, since their existence violates the conservation of energy and momentum, and hence FRET is known as a radiationless mechanism. Quantum electrodynamical calculations have been used to determine that radiationless FRET and radiative energy transfer are the short- and long-range asymptotes of a single unified mechanism.

== Terminology ==
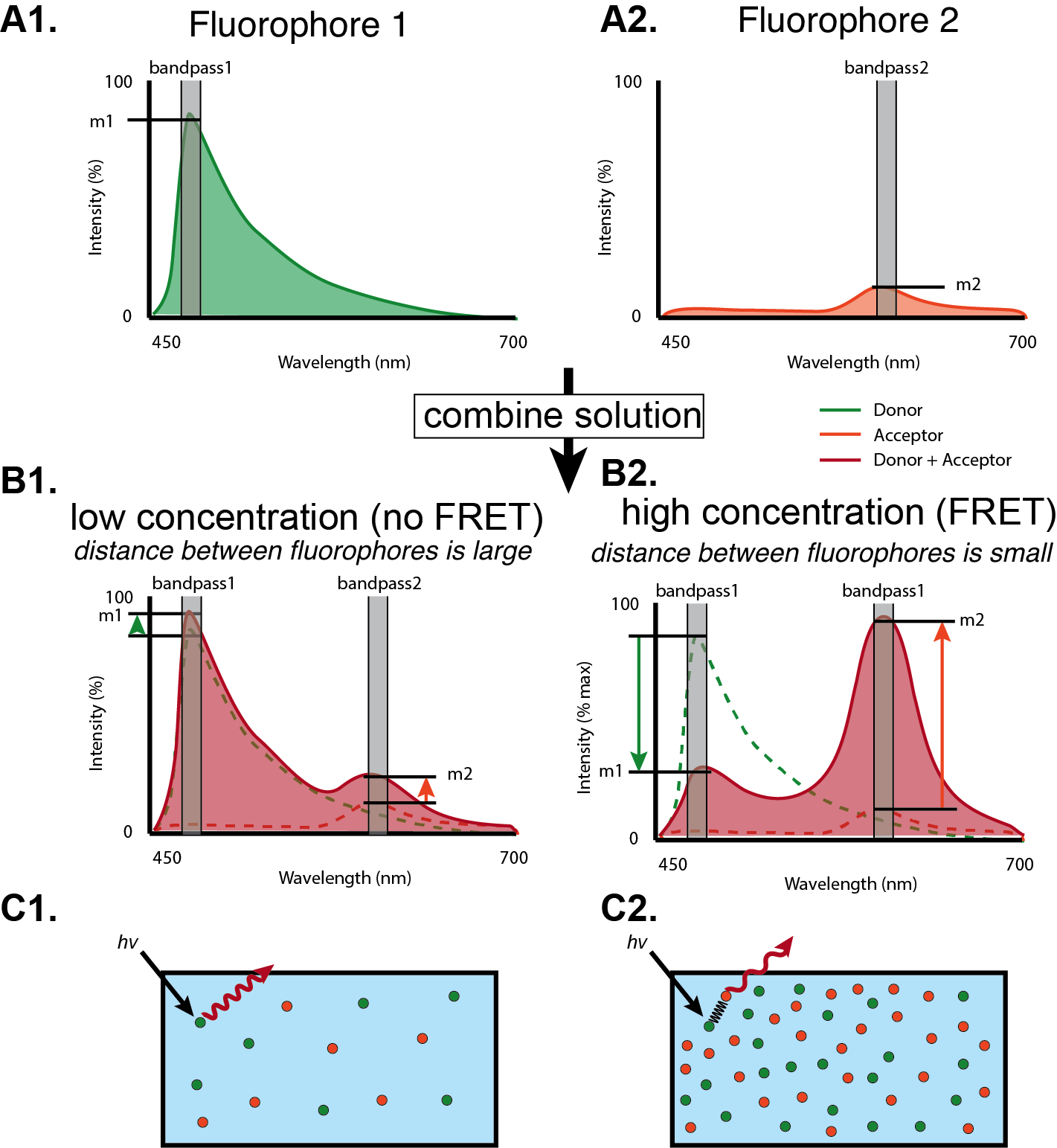
Cartoon diagram of the concept of Förster resonance energy transfer (FRET).

Förster resonance energy transfer is named after the German scientist Theodor Förster. When both chromophores are fluorescent, the term "fluorescence resonance energy transfer" is often used instead, although the energy is not actually transferred by fluorescence. In order to avoid an erroneous interpretation of the phenomenon that is always a nonradiative transfer of energy (even when occurring between two fluorescent chromophores), the name "Förster resonance energy transfer" is preferred to "fluorescence resonance energy transfer"; however, the latter enjoys common usage in scientific literature. FRET is not restricted to fluorescence and occurs in connection with phosphorescence as well. The energy transfer donor can also be an excited electronic state of a chemical product of a bioluminescent enzyme, in which Förster resonance energy transfer is often referred to as bioluminescence resonance energy transfer (BRET). However, the energy transfer also occurs before bioluminescence emission, and thus the term BRET is also mechanistically incorrect, although it also is commonly used to specify the type of donor.

== Theoretical basis ==
The FRET efficiency ($E$) is the quantum yield of the energy-transfer transition, i.e. the probability of energy-transfer event occurring per donor excitation event:

$$E = \frac{k_\text{ET}}{k_f + k_\text{ET} + \sum{k_i}},$$

where $k_f$ the radiative decay rate of the donor, $k_\text{ET}$ is the rate of energy transfer, and $k_i$ the rates of any other de-excitation pathways excluding energy transfers to other acceptors.

The FRET efficiency depends on many physical parameters that can be grouped as: 1) the distance between the donor and the acceptor (typically in the range of 1–10 nm), 2) the spectral overlap of the donor emission spectrum and the acceptor absorption spectrum, and 3) the relative orientation of the donor emission dipole moment and the acceptor absorption dipole moment.

$E$ depends on the donor-to-acceptor separation distance $r$ with an inverse 6th-power law due to the dipole–dipole coupling mechanism:

$$E = \frac{1}{1 + (r/R_0)^6}$$

with $R_0$ being the Förster distance of this pair of donor and acceptor, i.e. the distance at which the energy transfer efficiency is 50%. The Förster distance depends on the overlap integral of the donor emission spectrum with the acceptor absorption spectrum and their mutual molecular orientation as expressed by the following equation all in SI units:

$${R_0}^6 = \frac{2.07}{128 \, \pi^5 \, N_A} \, \frac{\kappa^2 \,Q_D}{n^4} {\int F_{\rm D}(\lambda) \, \epsilon_{\rm A}(\lambda) \, \lambda^4 \, d\lambda}$$

where $Q_\text{D}$ is the fluorescence quantum yield of the donor in the absence of the acceptor, $\kappa^2$ is the dipole orientation factor, $n$ is the refractive index of the medium, $N_\text{A}$ is the Avogadro constant, and $J$ is the spectral overlap integral calculated as

$$J = \frac{\int f_\text{D}(\lambda) \epsilon_\text{A}(\lambda) \lambda^4 \, d\lambda}{\int f_\text{D}(\lambda) \, d\lambda} = \int \overline{f_\text{D}}(\lambda) \epsilon_\text{A}(\lambda) \lambda^4 \, d\lambda,$$

where $f_\text{D}$ is the donor emission spectrum, $\overline{f_\text{D}}$ is the donor emission spectrum normalized to an area of 1, and $\epsilon_\text{A}$ is the acceptor molar extinction coefficient, normally obtained from an absorption spectrum. The orientation factor κ is given by

$$\kappa = \hat\mu_\text{A} \cdot \hat\mu_\text{D} - 3 (\hat\mu_\text{D} \cdot \hat R) (\hat\mu_\text{A} \cdot \hat R),$$

where $\hat\mu_i$ denotes the normalized transition dipole moment of the respective fluorophore, and $\hat R$ denotes the normalized inter-fluorophore displacement. $\kappa^2$ = 2/3 is often assumed. This value is obtained when both dyes are freely rotating and can be considered to be isotropically oriented during the excited-state lifetime. If either dye is fixed or not free to rotate, then $\kappa^2$ = 2/3 will not be a valid assumption. In most cases, however, even modest reorientation of the dyes results in enough orientational averaging that $\kappa^2$ = 2/3 does not result in a large error in the estimated energy-transfer distance due to the sixth-power dependence of $R_0$ on $\kappa^2$. Even when $\kappa^2$ is quite different from 2/3, the error can be associated with a shift in $R_0$, and thus determinations of changes in relative distance for a particular system are still valid. Fluorescent proteins do not reorient on a timescale that is faster than their fluorescence lifetime. In this case 0 ≤ $\kappa^2$ ≤ 4.

The units of the data are usually not in SI units. Using the original units to calculate the Förster distance is often more convenient. For example, the wavelength is often in unit nm and the extinction coefficient is often in unit $M^{-1} cm^{-1}$, where $M$ is concentration $mol/L$. $J$ obtained from these units will have unit $M^{-1} cm^{-1} nm^4$. To use unit Å ($10^{-10}m$) for the $R_0$, the equation is adjusted to

${R_0}^6 = 8.785 \times 10^{-5} \frac{\kappa^2 \,Q_D}{n^4} J$ (Å$^6$)

For time-dependent analyses of FRET, the rate of energy transfer ($k_\text{ET}$) can be used directly instead:

$$k_\text{ET} = \left(\frac{R_0}{r}\right)^6 \, \frac{1}{\tau_D}$$

where $\tau_D$ is the donor's fluorescence lifetime in the absence of the acceptor.

The FRET efficiency relates to the quantum yield and the fluorescence lifetime of the donor molecule as follows:

$$E = 1 - \tau'_\text{D}/\tau_\text{D},$$

where $\tau_\text{D}'$ and $\tau_\text{D}$ are the donor fluorescence lifetimes in the presence and absence of an acceptor respectively, or as

$$E = 1 - F_\text{D}'/F_\text{D},$$

where $F_\text{D}'$ and $F_\text{D}$ are the donor fluorescence intensities with and without an acceptor respectively.

== Experimental confirmation of the FRET theory ==
The inverse sixth-power distance dependence of Förster resonance energy transfer was experimentally confirmed by Wilchek, Edelhoch and Brand using tryptophyl peptides. Stryer, Haugland and Yguerabide also experimentally demonstrated the theoretical dependence of Förster resonance energy transfer on the overlap integral by using a fused indolosteroid as a donor and a ketone as an acceptor. Calculations on FRET distances of some example dye-pairs can be found here. However, a lot of contradictions of special experiments with the theory was observed under complicated environment when the orientations and quantum yields of the molecules are difficult to estimate.

== Methods to measure FRET efficiency ==
In fluorescence microscopy, fluorescence confocal laser scanning microscopy, as well as in molecular biology, FRET is a useful tool to quantify molecular dynamics in biophysics and biochemistry, such as protein-protein interactions, protein–DNA interactions, DNA-DNA interactions, and protein conformational changes. For monitoring the complex formation between two molecules, one of them is labeled with a donor and the other with an acceptor. The FRET efficiency is measured and used to identify interactions between the labeled complexes. There are several ways of measuring the FRET efficiency by monitoring changes in the fluorescence emitted by the donor or the acceptor.

=== Sensitized emission ===
One method of measuring FRET efficiency is to measure the variation in acceptor emission intensity. When the donor and acceptor are in proximity (1–10 nm) due to the interaction of the two molecules, the acceptor emission will increase because of the intermolecular FRET from the donor to the acceptor. For monitoring protein conformational changes, the target protein is labeled with a donor and an acceptor at two loci. When a twist or bend of the protein brings the change in the distance or relative orientation of the donor and acceptor, FRET change is observed. If a molecular interaction or a protein conformational change is dependent on ligand binding, this FRET technique is applicable to fluorescent indicators for the ligand detection.

=== Photobleaching FRET ===
FRET efficiencies can also be inferred from the photobleaching rates of the donor in the presence and absence of an acceptor. This method can be performed on most fluorescence microscopes; one simply shines the excitation light (of a frequency that will excite the donor but not the acceptor significantly) on specimens with and without the acceptor fluorophore and monitors the donor fluorescence (typically separated from acceptor fluorescence using a bandpass filter) over time. The timescale is that of photobleaching, which is seconds to minutes, with fluorescence in each curve being given by

$$\text{background} + \text{constant} \cdot e^{-\text{time}/\tau_\text{pb}},$$

where $\tau_\text{pb}$ is the photobleaching decay time constant and depends on whether the acceptor is present or not. Since photobleaching consists in the permanent inactivation of excited fluorophores, resonance energy transfer from an excited donor to an acceptor fluorophore prevents the photobleaching of that donor fluorophore, and thus high FRET efficiency leads to a longer photobleaching decay time constant:

$$E = 1 - \tau_\text{pb}/\tau_\text{pb}',$$

where $\tau_\text{pb}'$ and $\tau_\text{pb}$ are the photobleaching decay time constants of the donor in the presence and in the absence of the acceptor respectively. (Notice that the fraction is the reciprocal of that used for lifetime measurements).

This technique was introduced by Jovin in 1989. Its use of an entire curve of points to extract the time constants can give it accuracy advantages over the other methods. Also, the fact that time measurements are over seconds rather than nanoseconds makes it easier than fluorescence lifetime measurements, and because photobleaching decay rates do not generally depend on donor concentration (unless acceptor saturation is an issue), the careful control of concentrations needed for intensity measurements is not needed. It is, however, important to keep the illumination the same for the with- and without-acceptor measurements, as photobleaching increases markedly with more intense incident light.

=== Lifetime measurements ===
FRET efficiency can also be determined from the change in the fluorescence lifetime of the donor. The lifetime of the donor will decrease in the presence of the acceptor. Lifetime measurements of the FRET-donor are used in fluorescence-lifetime imaging microscopy (FLIM).

=== Single-molecule FRET (smFRET) ===
smFRET is a group of methods using various microscopic techniques to measure a pair of donor and acceptor fluorophores that are excited and detected at the single molecule level. In contrast to "ensemble FRET" or "bulk FRET" which provides the FRET signal of a high number of molecules, single-molecule FRET is able to resolve the FRET signal of each individual molecule. The variation of the smFRET signal is useful to reveal kinetic information that an ensemble measurement cannot provide, especially when the system is under equilibrium. Heterogeneity among different molecules can also be observed. This method has been applied in many measurements of biomolecular dynamics such as DNA/RNA/protein folding/unfolding and other conformational changes, and intermolecular dynamics such as reaction, binding, adsorption, and desorption that are particularly useful in chemical sensing, bioassays, and biosensing.

== Fluorophores used for FRET ==
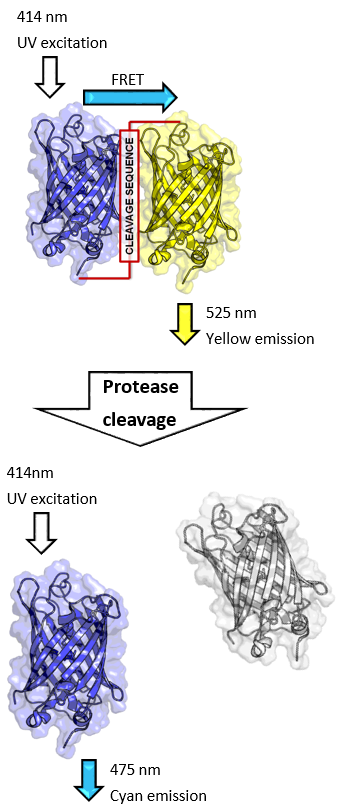
If the linker is intact, excitation at the absorbance wavelength of CFP (414 nm) causes emission by YFP (525 nm) due to FRET. If the linker is cleaved by a protease, FRET is abolished and emission is at the CFP wavelength (475 nm).

=== CFP-YFP pairs ===
One common pair fluorophores for biological use is a cyan fluorescent protein (CFP) – yellow fluorescent protein (YFP) pair. Both are color variants of green fluorescent protein (GFP). Labeling with organic fluorescent dyes requires purification, chemical modification, and intracellular injection of a host protein. GFP variants can be attached to a host protein by genetic engineering which can be more convenient. Additionally, a fusion of CFP and YFP ("tandem-dimer") linked by a protease cleavage sequence can be used as a cleavage assay.

=== BRET ===
A limitation of FRET performed with fluorophore donors is the requirement for external illumination to initiate the fluorescence transfer, which can lead to background noise in the results from direct excitation of the acceptor or to photobleaching. To avoid this drawback, luciferase enzymes and their substrates can be used to provide the energy donor; as described above this implementation of FRET is commonly termed bioluminescence resonance energy transfer (BRET).

BRET has been implemented using natural luciferase enzymes from insects or the sea pansy Renilla reniformis, or engineered monomeric forms of the luciferase from Oplophorus gracilirostris, named NanoLuc or NanoKAZ. The smaller size and higher catalytic activity of NanoLuc or NanoKAZ generally improve BRET efficiency and photon output rates compared to other luciferases. BRET from NanoLuc has been used to detect protein-protein interactions or to redshift a luciferase's emission spectrum to wavelengths that are more transmissive through tissue.

=== Homo-FRET ===
In general, "FRET" refers to situations where the donor and acceptor proteins (or "fluorophores") are of two different types. In many biological situations, however, researchers might need to examine the interactions between two, or more, proteins of the same type—or indeed the same protein with itself, for example if the protein folds or forms part of a polymer chain of proteins or for other questions of quantification in biological cells or in vitro experiments.

Obviously, differences in conventional UV-vis spectra will not be the tool used to detect and measure homogeneous FRET, as both the acceptor and donor emit light with the same wavelengths. However, there is evidence that certain nonlinear spectroscopies may provide signatures of homogeneous FRET that would be invisible in linear spectra. Yet researchers can detect differences in the polarisation between the light which excites the fluorophores and the light which is emitted, in a technique called FRET anisotropy imaging; the level of quantified anisotropy (difference in polarisation between the excitation and emission beams) then becomes an indicative guide to how many FRET events have happened.

In the field of nano-photonics, FRET can be detrimental if it funnels excitonic energy to defect sites, but it is also essential to charge collection in organic and quantum-dot-sensitized solar cells, and various FRET-enabled strategies have been proposed for different opto-electronic devices. It is then essential to understand how isolated nano-emitters behave when they are stacked in a dense layer. Nanoplatelets are especially promising candidates for strong homo-FRET exciton diffusion because of their strong in-plane dipole coupling and low Stokes shift. Fluorescence microscopy study of such single chains demonstrated that energy transfer by FRET between neighbor platelets causes energy to diffuse over a typical 500-nm length (about 80 nano emitters), and the transfer time between platelets is on the order of 1 ps.

=== Others ===
Various compounds beside fluorescent proteins.

== Applications ==
The applications of FRET, mostly with fluorophore donors, have expanded tremendously in the last 25 years, and the technique has become a staple in many biological and biophysical fields. FRET can be used as a spectroscopic ruler to measure distance and detect molecular interactions in a number of systems and has applications in biology and biochemistry.

=== Proteins ===
FRET is often used to detect and track interactions between proteins. Additionally, FRET can be used to measure distances between domains in a single protein by tagging different regions of the protein with fluorophores and measuring emission to determine distance. This provides information about protein conformation, including secondary structures and protein folding. This extends to tracking functional changes in protein structure, such as conformational changes associated with myosin activity. Applied in vivo, FRET has been used to detect the location and interactions of cellular structures including integrins and membrane proteins.

=== Membranes ===
FRET can be used to observe membrane fluidity, movement and dispersal of membrane proteins, membrane lipid-protein and protein-protein interactions, and successful mixing of different membranes. FRET is also used to study formation and properties of membrane domains and lipid rafts in cell membranes and to determine surface density in membranes.

=== Chemosensor ===
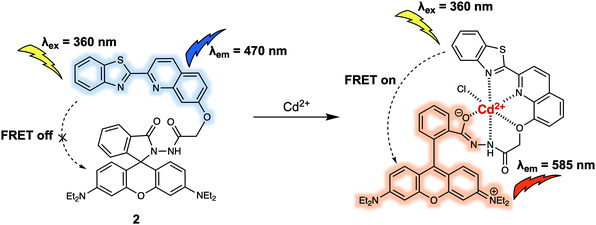
FRET-based probe that activates upon interaction with Cd2+

FRET-based probes can detect the presence of various molecules: the probe's structure is affected by small molecule binding or activity, which can turn the FRET system on or off. This is often used to detect anions, cations, small uncharged molecules, and some larger biomacromolecules as well. Similarly, FRET systems have been designed to detect changes in the cellular environment due to such factors as pH, hypoxia, or mitochondrial membrane potential.

=== Signaling pathways ===
Another use for FRET is in the study of metabolic or signaling pathways. For example, FRET with both fluorescent and bioluminescent donors have been used in various experiments to characterize G-protein coupled receptor activation and consequent signaling mechanisms. Other examples include the use of FRET to analyze such diverse processes as bacterial chemotaxis and caspase activity in apoptosis.

=== Proteins and nucleotides folding kinetics ===
Proteins, DNAs, RNAs, and other polymer folding dynamics have been measured using FRET. Usually, these systems are under equilibrium whose kinetics is hidden. However, they can be measured by measuring single-molecule FRET with proper placement of the acceptor and donor dyes on the molecules. See single-molecule FRET for a more detailed description.

=== Other applications ===
In addition to common uses previously mentioned, FRET is also effective in the study of biochemical reaction kinetics. FRET is increasingly used for monitoring pH dependent assembly and disassembly and is valuable in the analysis of nucleic acids encapsulation. This technique can be used to determine factors affecting various types of nanoparticle formation as well as the mechanisms and effects of nanomedicines.

== See also ==
- Dexter electron transfer
- Förster coupling
- Surface energy transfer
- Time-resolved fluorescence energy transfer
