= Triplet-triplet annihilation =

Energy transfer mechanism with excited molecules

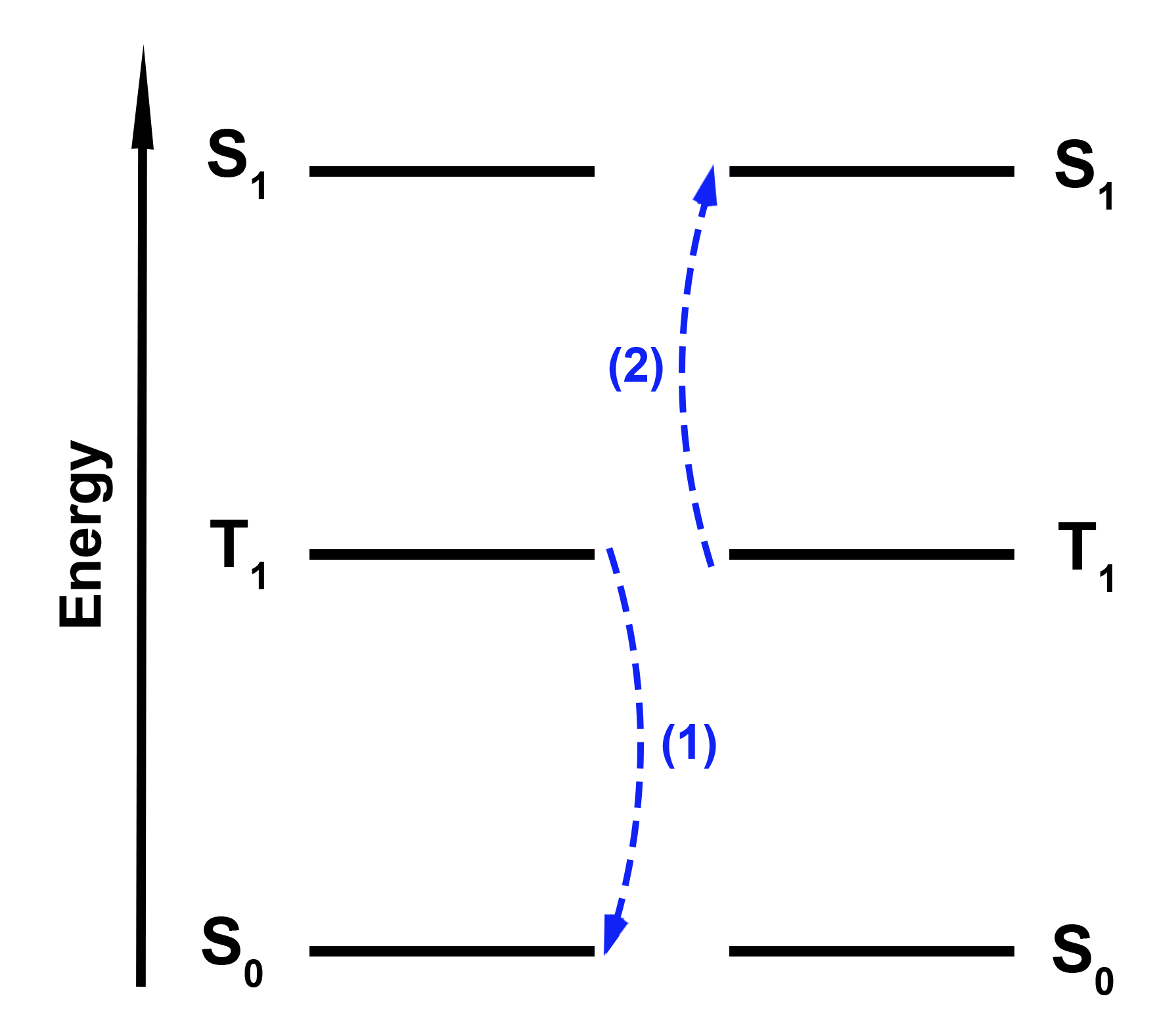
A Jablonski diagram describing the mechanism of triplet-triplet annihilation. The energy of the first triplet excited state (T_{1}) is transferred to a second triplet excited state (T_{1}), resulting in (1) the first T_{1} returning to the singlet ground state S0 and (2) the second T_{1} promoting to the singlet excited state (S_{1}).

Triplet-triplet annihilation (TTA) is an energy transfer mechanism where two molecules in their triplet excited states interact to form a ground state molecule and an excited molecule in its singlet state. This mechanism is example of Dexter energy transfer mechanism. In triplet-triplet annihilation, one molecule transfers its excited state energy to the second molecule, resulting in the first molecule returning to its ground state and the second molecule being promoted to a higher excited singlet state.

Triplet-triplet annihilation was first discovered in the 1960s to explain the observation of delayed fluorescence in anthracene derivatives.

== Photon upconversion ==
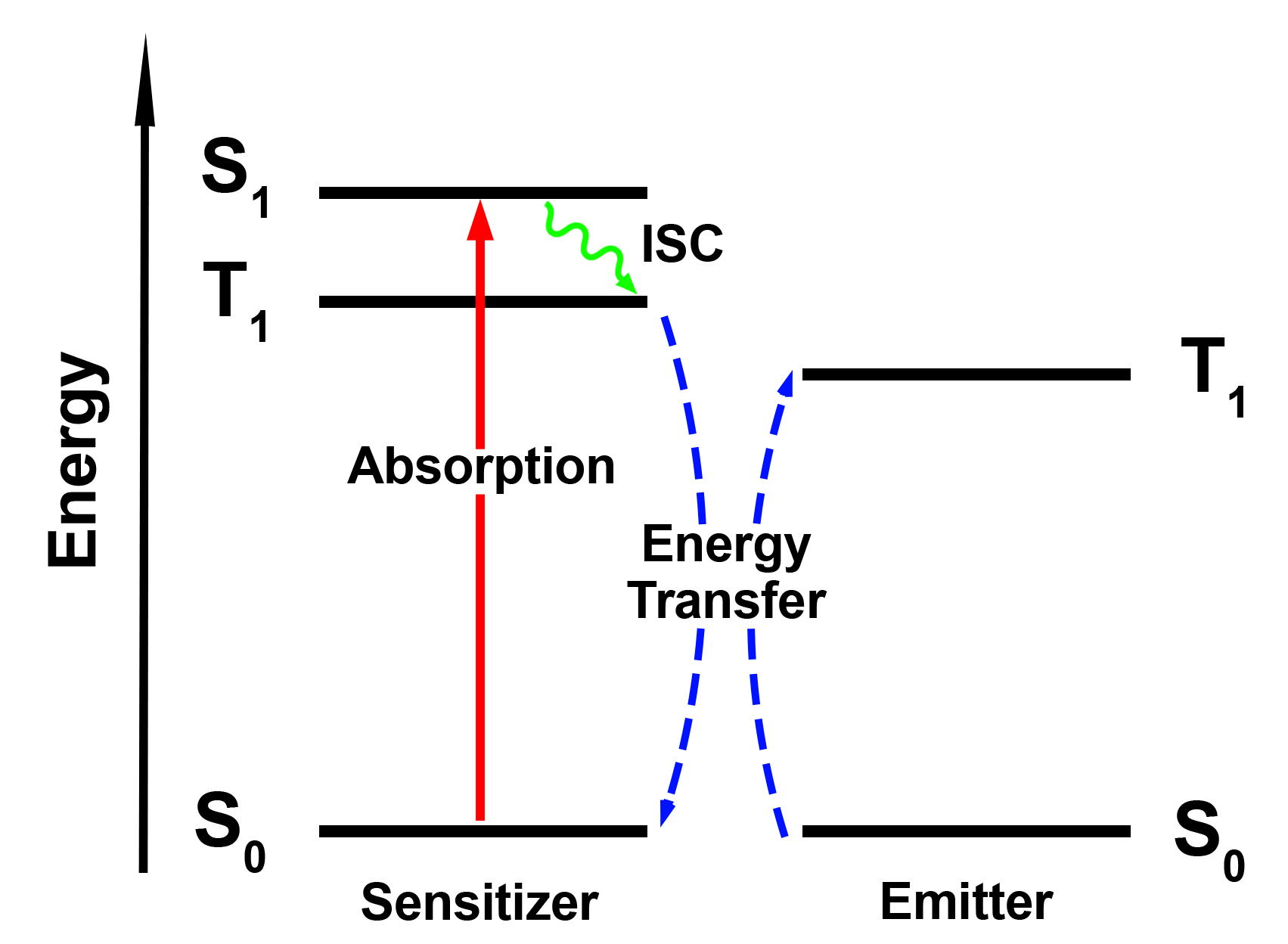
A Jablonski diagram describing the sensitization process in triplet-triplet annihilation upconversion. The sensitizer first absorbs light and reaches its first singlet excited state (S_{1}). The sensitizer S_{1} state undergoes intersystem crossing (ISC) to the triplet excited state (T_{1}). The sensitizer then transfers energy to the emitter, which returns the sensitizer T_{1} to the ground state (S_{0}) and promotes the emitter to its T_{1}.

Triplet-triplet annihilation combines the energy of two triplet-excited molecules onto one molecule to produce a higher excited state. Since the higher excited state is an emissive singlet state, TTA can be used to achieve photon upconversion which is a process that converts the energy of two photons into one photon of higher energy. To achieve photon upconversion through triplet-triplet annihilation two types of molecules are often combined: a sensitizer and an emitter (annihilator). The sensitizer absorbs the low energy photon and populates its first excited triplet state (T_{1}) through intersystem crossing. The sensitizer then transfers the excitation energy to the emitter, resulting in a triplet excited emitter and a ground state sensitizer. Two triplet-excited emitters can then undergo triplet-triplet annihilation to produce a singlet excited state (S_{1}) of the emitter, which can emit an upconverted photon.

=== Requirements ===
For efficient TTA upconversion, the sensitizer should absorb strongly in the desired excitation range and have high conversion efficiency from the singlet excited state to the triplet excited state. The emitter should have a singlet energy level just below twice the energy of the first triplet excited state. Both the emitter and sensitizer should have long triplet-state lifetimes so that the TTA mechanism has enough time to occur.

=== Applications ===
Triplet-triplet annihilation upconversion (TTA-UC) materials have the advantages of needing low excitation power and having changeable emission and excitation light wavelengths. Due to these advantages, many applications of TTA-UC materials have been explored.

==== Solar cells ====
Solar cells are electrical devices that convert sunlight to electricity. However, due to the properties of the materials composing solar cells, many solar cells do not harvest low energy (with wavelength above 800 nm) photons efficiently. Thus, the ability for TTA-UC materials to combine the energy of two low energy photons into one high energy photon is desirable to capture more of the energy from sunlight.

==== Organic light-emitting diodes ====
Light-emitting materials that can convert non-emissive triplet states into emissive singlet states are crucial in organic light-emitting diodes (OLEDs) as, statistically, 75% of the excited states formed in an OLED are triplet states. TTA materials are well suited to use in OLEDs due to their low operational voltage, small drop-off in efficiency when increasing brightness, and low cost. However, most TTA materials emit photons that are blue to deep blue, which limits their applications in OLEDs until the colour variety diversifies.

==== Cancer therapy ====
In photolysis cancer therapy, light is used to selectively break bonds which releases and activates a target drug molecule. The drug molecule can be released near or in tumour sites to combat the disease. TTA-UC materials that can be excited by near-infrared light are desirable for this application since near-infrared light penetrates tissue well.
