= Surface energy transfer =

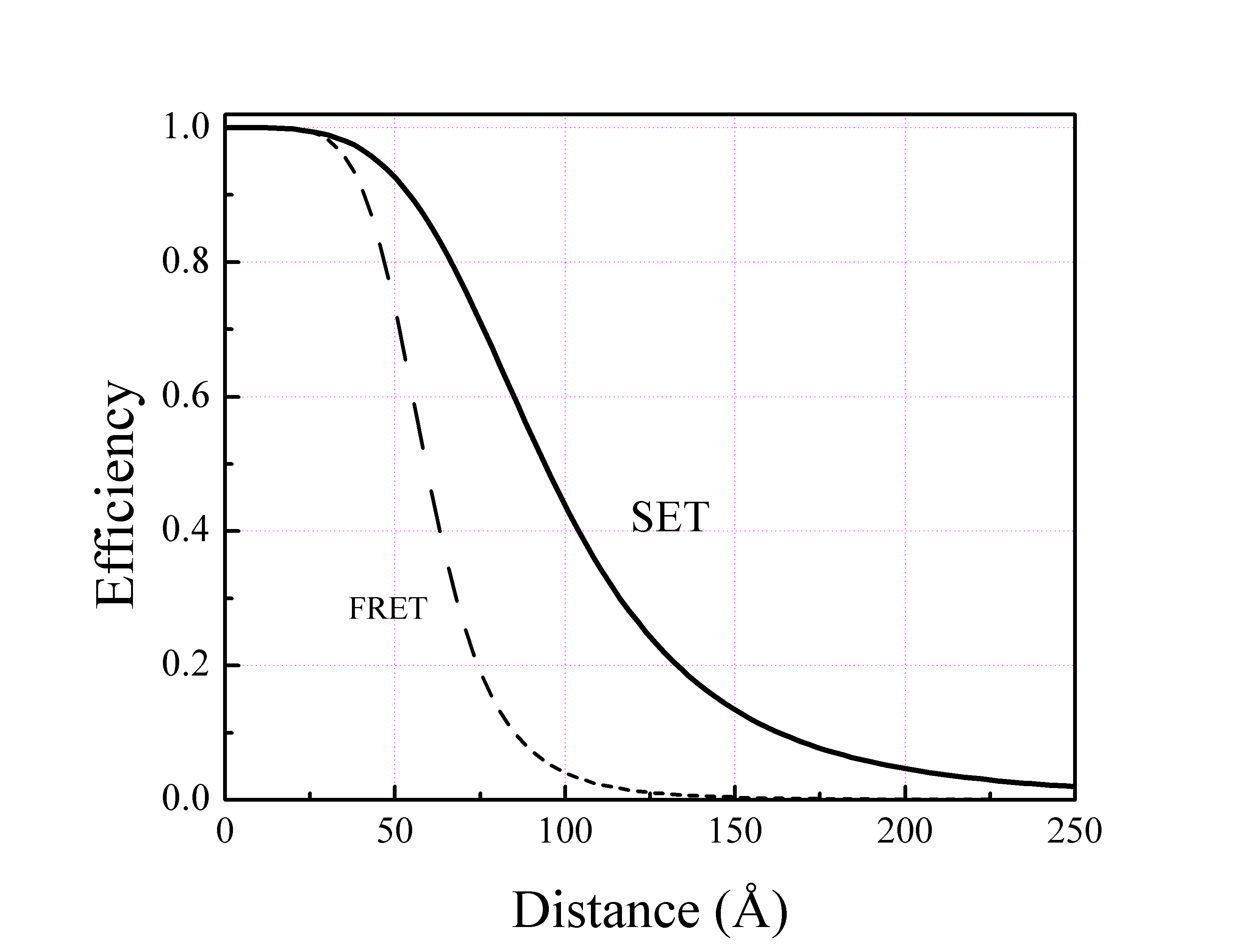
Comparison of energy transfer efficiency between SET and Förster resonance energy transfer (FRET)

Surface energy transfer (SET) is a dipole-surface energy transfer process involving a metallic surface and a molecular dipole.

== Formula ==
The SET rate follows the inverse of the fourth power of the distance

$$k_\text{SET} = \frac{1}{\tau_D} \left(\frac{d_0}{d}\right)^{\! 4}$$

where

- $\tau_D$ is the donor emission lifetime;
- $d$ is the distance between donor-acceptor;
- $d_0$ is the distance at which SET efficiency decreases to 50% (i.e., equal probability of energy transfer and spontaneous emission).

== Efficiency ==
The energy transfer efficiency also follows a similar form

$$\phi _{SET}=\frac{1}{1+({d}/{d_{0}})^{4}}$$

Due to the fourth power dependence SET can cover a distance more than 15 nm, which is almost twice the efficiency of FRET. Theoretically predicted in 1978 by Chance et al. it was proved experimentally in 2000s by different workers.

== Applications ==
The efficiency of SET as nanoruler has been used in live cells.

Gold nano particles are frequently used in these studies as the nanoparticle surface.

== See also ==
- Dexter electron transfer
- Förster resonance energy transfer
