= Energy transfer upconversion =

Physical principle

Energy Transfer Upconversion or ETU is a physical principle (most commonly encountered in solid-state laser physics) that involves the excitation of a laser-active ion to a level above that which would be achieved by simple absorption of a pump photon, the required additional energy being transferred from another laser-active ion undergoing nonradiative deexcitation.

ETU involves two fundamental ideas: energy transfer and upconversion. The analysis below will discuss ETU in the context of an optically pumped [see optical pumping] solid-state laser.

A solid-state laser [see also laser] has laser-active ions embedded in a host medium. Energy may be transferred between these by dipole–dipole interaction (over short distances) or by fluorescence and reabsorption (over longer distances). In the case of ETU it is primarily dipole–dipole energy transfer that is of interest.

If a laser-active ion is in an excited state, it can decay to a lower state either radiatively (i.e. energy is conserved by the emission of a photon, as required for laser operation) or nonradiatively. Nonradiative emission may be via Auger decay or via energy transfer to another laser-active ion. If this occurs, the ion receiving the energy will be excited to a higher energy state than that already achieved by absorption of a pump photon. This process of further exciting an already excited laser-active ion is known as photon upconversion.

ETU is normally an unwanted effect when building lasers. Nonradiative decay is itself an inefficiency (in a perfect laser every downward transition would be a stimulated emission event), whilst the excitation of the energy-receiving ion can result in heating of the gain medium. When ETU occurs due to a clustering of ions within the host medium, it is sometimes termed concentration quenching.
