= Dexter electron transfer =

Non-radiative transfer of an excited electron between molecules

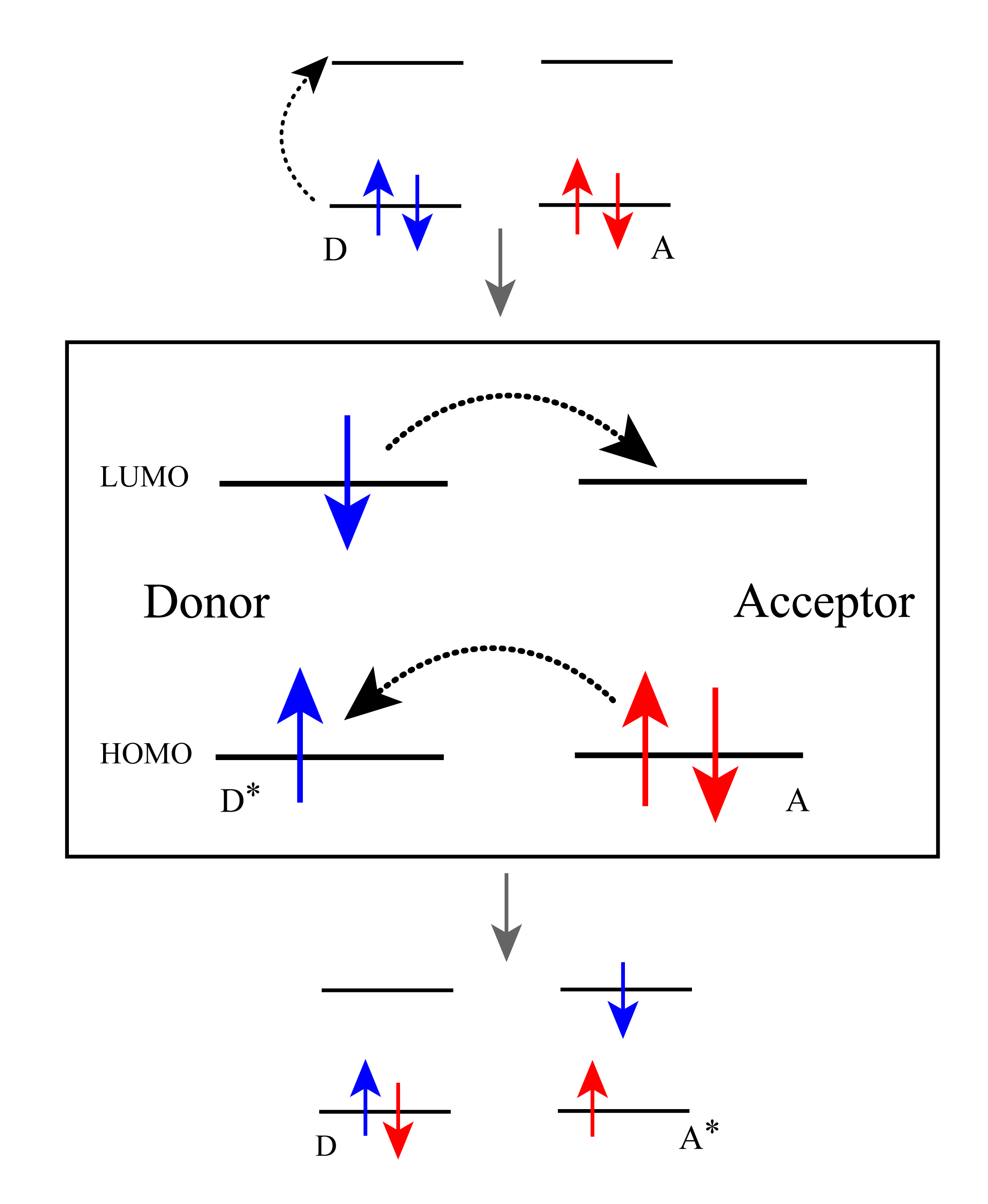
Schematic of Dexter electron (energy) transfer

Dexter electron transfer (also called Dexter electron exchange and Dexter energy transfer) is a fluorescence quenching mechanism in which an excited electron is transferred from one molecule (a donor) to a second molecule (an acceptor) via a non radiative path. This process requires a wavefunction overlap between the donor and acceptor, which means it can only occur at short distances; typically within 10 Å (1 nm). The excited state may be exchanged in a single step, or in two separate charge exchange steps.

== History ==
This short range energy transfer process was first theoretically proposed by D. L. Dexter in 1953.

== Rate expression ==
The Dexter energy transfer rate, $k_{ET}$, is indicated by the formula:

$$k_{ET} = K J' \mathrm{exp}\left [ \frac{-2r}{L} \right ]$$

where $r$ is the separation of the donor from the acceptor, $L$ is the sum of the Van der Waals radii of the donor and the acceptor, and $J'$ is the normalized spectral overlap integral, where normalized means that both emission intensity and extinction coefficient have been adjusted to unit area. It is important noticed that $J'$, because it is normalized, does not depend on the actual magnitude of extinction coefficient nor on the donor fluorescence quantum yield. This difference is an important distinction from the situation for dipole-dipole energy transfer. The overlap integral $J'$ simply derives from the density of degenerate states that couple donor and acceptor (from Fermi's golden rule), i.e. is a measure of the number of states that are capable of satisfying the resonance condition. Because $K$ is a constant that is not related to any spectroscopic data, it is difficult to characterize the exchange mechanism experimentally.

== See also ==
- Fluorescence
- Quenching
- Förster resonance energy transfer
- Surface energy transfer
