= Kramer (surname) =

Kramer (/ˈkreɪmər/ KRAY-mər) is an occupational surname. In Middle Low German during the Late Middle Ages, Kramer meant "shopkeeper" or "merchant". The meaning later changed to "merchants trading with different rather small things". It is Dutch or Low German origin (Dutch pronunciation: [ˈkraːmər]) or is derived from the High German surname Krämer (pronounced [ˈkʁɛːmɐ]).

== People with this name ==
=== A ===
- Aaron Kramer (1921–1997), American poet, essayist, and translator, Silesian German chess master
- Albert Kramer (1882–1943), Slovenian and Yugoslavian politician
- Alex Kramer (1903–1998), Canadian songwriter
- Amanda Kramer (born 1960s), American musician
- Andreas Kramer (born 1997), Swedish middle-distance runner
- Ann-Kathrin Kramer (born 1966), German writer and actress
- Annemarie Kramer (born 1975), Dutch sprinter
- Alisha Kramer (born 1990), American physician and health activist
- Arlene Kramer Richards (born c. 1935), American psychoanalyst
- Arnold Kramer (1882–1976) was an American folk artist
- Arthur Kramer (1927–2008), American lawyer
- Arthur F. Kramer, American neuroscientist
- Arvid Kramer (born 1956), American basketball player

=== B ===
- Barry Kramer (1942–2025), American basketball player, jurist and attorney
- Barry Kramer, former editor and occasional host of Game Grumps
- Ben Kramer (1913–99), American basketball player
- Benjamin F. Kramer (born 1957), U.S. (Maryland) politician
- Bert Kramer (1934–2001), American actor
- Bill Kramer (born 1965), U.S. (Wisconsin) politician
- Billy J. Kramer (born 1943), British merseybeat singer
- Boaz Kramer (born 1978), Israeli wheelchair tennis player
- Bob Kramer (born c. 1957), American knifesmith
- Bryan Jared Kramer (born 1974), Member of Parliament for Madang Open, Papua New Guinea
- Bryan Jeffrey Kramer, American social media businessman
- Burton Kramer (born 1932), Canadian graphic designer and artist

=== C ===
- Caleb Kramer (born 2006), Kenyan footballer
- Cecilie Breil Kramer (born 1987), Danish football goalkeeper
- Charles Kramer (politician), (1879–1943), Californian politician
- Charles Kramer (economist) (1907–1992), American economist, spy for the Soviet Union in the 1940s
- Charles Kramer (attorney) (1916–1988), lawyer from New York
- Charles Kramer (producer) (born 1970s), American television producer
- Chiel Kramer (born 1992), Dutch football goalkeeper
- Chris Kramer (actor) (born 1975), Canadian television actor
- Chris Kramer (born 1988), American basketball player in the Israel Basketball Premier League
- Christian Kramer (?–1834), German composer and musician at the British court
- Christina Kramer (born c. 1963), Canadian Slavic linguist
- Christoph Kramer (born 1991), German footballer
- Clare Kramer (born 1974), American actress

=== D ===
- Daniel Kramer (born 1977), American stage and opera director
- David Kramer (singer) (born 1951), South African singer, songwriter, playwright and director
- David Kramer (soccer) (born 1972), American soccer goalkeeper
- David J. Kramer, United States Assistant Secretary of State for democracy, human rights, and labor, 2008–2009
- Dawn Kramer (born 1945), American choreographer and dancer
- Dean Kramer (born 1952), American pianist
- Denise Kramer-Scholer (1910–1993), Swiss fencer
- Dennis Kramer (1992–2023), German-American basketball player
- Dick Kramer (born 1972), Dutch cricketer
- Dieter Kramer (born 1959), German footballer
- Don Kramer (born 1969), American comics artist
- Don Kramer (politician) (born 1940), American politician
- Doug Kramer (born 1983), Filipino basketball player
- Doug Kramer (American football) (born 1998), American football player

=== E ===
- Eddie Kramer (born 1941), South African audio engineer and producer
- Edith Kramer (1916–2014), Austrian artist
- Edmond Kramer (1906–1945), Swiss footballer
- Edna Kramer (1902–1984), American mathematician
- Edward E. Kramer (born 1961), American editor and author of science fiction, fantasy, and horror works
- Eileen Kramer (1914–2024), Australian dancer, artist, performer and choreographer
- Eiling Kramer (1914–1999), Canadian Politician
- Eitan Kramer (born 1978), American Vert Skater
- Eliyahu Kramer "Vilna Gaon" (1720–1797) Lithuanian Rabbi, the genius of Vilna
- Eric Allan Kramer (born 1962), American actor
- Erik Kramer (born 1964), American football quarterback
- Erwin Kramer (1902–1979), German politician

=== F ===
- Felix Kramer (born 1949), American founder of CalCars
- Ferdinand Kramer (1898–1985), German architect and functionalist designer
- Francisco Villagrán Kramer (1927–2011), Guatemalan legal scholar and politician
- Frank Kramer (artist) (1905–1993), American artist and illustrator
- Frank Kramer (director) (1925–2018), a pseudonym of the Italian film director Gianfranco Parolini
- Frank Kramer (footballer, born 1972) (born 1972), German football player and coach
- Frank Louis Kramer (1880–1952), American cyclist and United States Bicycling Hall of Fame inductee
- Franz Kramer (1865–1924), United States Navy sailor

=== G ===
- Garret Kramer (born c. 1962), American mental performance coach
- George Kramer (philatelist), American philatelist
- George W. Kramer (1848–1938), American architect
- Georges Kramer (1898-?), Swiss football player and coach
- Gordon Kramer (1921–1989), Australian rules footballer
- Gorni Kramer (1913–1995), Italian songwriter, musician, and band leader
- Greg Kramer (1961–2013), British-born Canadian author, actor, director, and magician
- Gustav Kramer (1910–1959), German zoologist and ornithologist

=== H ===
- Haije Kramer (1917–2004), Dutch chess master and theoretician
- Harry Kramer (announcer) (1911–1996), American radio and television announcer
- Harry Kramer (German artist) (1925–1997), German artist
- Harry Kramer (American artist) (born 1939), American artist
- Heinrich Kramer a.k.a. Heinrich Institor (c. 1430 – 1505), Alsatian churchman and inquisitor
- Heinz Kramer (1925–1965), German sports shooter
- Hilaria Kramer (born 1967), Swiss jazz trumpeter and composer
- Hilton Kramer (1928–2012), American art critic
- Hubertus Kramer (1959-2022), German politician

=== I ===
- Ida Kramer, (1877/1878 – 1930), American actress
- Iris Kramer (born 1981), German motorcycle trials rider

=== J ===
- Jack Kramer (baseball) (1918–1995), American baseball pitcher
- Jack Kramer (American football) (1919–1978), American football player
- Jack Kramer (1921–2009), American tennis player
- Jacob Kramer (1892–1962), Ukrainian-born painter in England
- Jana Kramer (born 1983), American actress
- Jane Kramer (born 1938), American journalist
- Jason Kramer (born c. 1970), American radio personality
- Jeffrey Kramer (born 1945), American film and television actor and producer
- Jens Kramer Mikkelsen (born 1951), Danish mayor of Copenhagen
- Jeroen Kramer (born 1967), Dutch photographer
- Jerry Kramer (born 1936), American professional football player
- Jessy Kramer (born 1990), Dutch team handball player
- Jim Kramer (born 1958), American Scrabble player
- Joan Whitney Kramer (1914–1990), American singer and songwriter
- Joel Kramer (born 1955), American basketball player
- Joey Kramer (born 1950), American drummer with the musical group Aerosmith
- John Kramer (darts player) (born 1956), American darts player
- John R. Kramer (1937–2006), American law educator
- Jolly Kramer-Johansen (1902–1968), Norwegian composer
- Jonathan Kramer (1942–2004), American composer and music theorist
- Joris Kramer (born 1996), Dutch footballer
- Josef Kramer (1906–1945), German commandant of Bergen-Belsen concentration camp executed for war crimes

=== K ===
- Kane Kramer (born 1956), British inventor and businessman
- Ken Kramer (born 1942), American politician
- Ken Kramer, American broadcaster
- Kenny Kramer (born 1943), American stand-up comedian, on whom the Seinfeld character Cosmo Kramer was based
- Kent Kramer (1944–2024), American professional football player
- Kent A. Kramer (born 1961), Iowan politician
- Kieran Kramer, American romance novelist

=== L ===
- Larry Kramer (1935–2020), American dramatist, author and gay rights activist
- Larry Kramer (American football) (1942–2014), American football player and coach
- Larry Kramer (legal scholar) (born 1958), American legal scholar, dean of Stanford Law School
- Lawrence Kramer (musicologist) (born 1946), American musicologist
- Lawrence Francis Kramer (1933–2023), American politician, two-time Mayor of Paterson, New Jersey
- Leah Kramer, American craftster, author, website programmer
- Leonie Kramer (1924–2016), Australian academic and commentator
- Leopold Kramer (1869–1942), Austrian stage and film actor
- Lloyd Kramer (born 1947), American filmmaker
- Louis Kramer (1848–1922), American baseball executive
- Louise Kramer (1923–2020), American sculptor
- Lud Kramer (1932–2004), U.S. politician in Washington State
- Lynn Kramer, American skateboarder

=== M ===
- Mandel Kramer (1916–1989), American TV actor and voice actor
- Marcel Kramer (born 1977), German politician
- Marcia Kramer (born 1948), American journalist
- Mariska Kramer (born 1974), Dutch triathlete
- Marita Kramer (born 2001), Dutch-born Austrian ski jumper
- Mark Kramer (jazz pianist) (born 1945), American jazz musician
- Mark Kramer (born 1958), American alternative rock musician and producer
- Mark Kramer (journalist), Mark William Kramer, an American journalist, author, professor, and editor.
- Martin Kramer (born 1954), American author on Islam and Arab politics
- Mary Kramer (born 1935), American (Iowa) politician
- Matt Kramer (musician) (born 1968), American singer formerly with rock band Saigon Kick
- Matt Kramer (wine writer), American wine writer
- Matthew Kramer (born 1959), American philosopher at the University of Cambridge
- Max Kramer (1903–1986), German scientist, developed Ruhrstahl X-4 missile (1943–1945)
- Michael Kramer (astronomer) (born 1967), German astronomer and astrophysicist
- Michael Kramer (narrator), American audiobook narrator
- Michael Eric Kramer, American film actor
- Michiel Kramer (born 1988), Dutch footballer
- Mike Kramer (born 1955), American football coach

=== N ===
- Nathaniel Kramer (born 1961), American filmmaker
- Nicole Kramer (born 1962), American swimmer

=== O ===
- Orin Kramer (born c. 1945), American hedge fund manager
- Oscar Kramer (1935–2010), Argentine film producer

=== P ===
- Pascale Kramer (born 1961), Swiss author
- Patricia Kramer (born 1979), Uruguayan musician and politician
- Paul J. Kramer (1904–1995), American biologist and plant physiologist.
- Paul Kramer (1933–2020), U.S. (New Jersey) politician
- Perry Kramer (born 1959), U.S. motocross racer
- Peter Kramer (physicist) (1933–2026), German physicist
- Peter Kramer (priest), German priest convicted of child abuse
- Peter D. Kramer (born 1948), American psychiatrist
- Philip Taylor Kramer (1952–1995), American physicist and bassist with the musical group Iron Butterfly
- Piet Kramer (1881–1961), Dutch architect

=== R ===
- Rachel Kramer (born 1980), Dutch singer
- Rachel Kramer Bussel (born 1975), American erotica writer
- Randy Kramer (born 1960), American baseball pitcher
- Regine Kramer (born 1993), German pole vaulter
- Rene Kramer (born 1987), German ice hockey player
- Rhonda Kramer, American air traffic reporter
- Richard Kramer (judge) (born 1947), American superior court judge
- Richard Kramer (writer) (born 1952), American screenwriter, novelist and television producer
- Richard J. Kramer (born 1963), American CEO of Goodyear Tire Co.
- Robert Kramer (1939–1999), American film director, screenwriter and actor
- Roger Kramer (1939–2023), Canadian football player
- Ron Kramer (1935–2010), American football player
- Rona E. Kramer (born 1954), Maryland politician
- Ronald Kramer (business) (born c. 1959), American businessman
- Roy Kramer (1929–2025), American college football coach and athletics administrator
- Rudolf Kramer (1886–?), Austrian road racing cyclist
- Rudolf Kramer (poultry expert) (1844–1904), German poultry expert
- Ruth Kramer (1926–2015), All-American girls professional baseball league player

=== S ===
- Samuel Noah Kramer (1897–1990), Ukraine-born American historian and assyriologist
- Sarah Kramer (born 1968), Canadian cookbook author
- Shalom Kramer (1912–1978), Israeli essayist, editor, and literary critic
- Sherry Kramer, American playwright
- Shlomo Kramer, Israeli information technology entrepreneur
- Sidney B. Kramer (1915–2014), American publishing executive and literary agent
- Sidney Kramer (1925–2022), American (Maryland) politician
- Stanley Kramer (1913–2001), American movie director and producer
- Stefan Kramer (impressionist) (born 1982), Chilean impressionist, actor, comedian and announcer
- Stella Kramer (born 1989), German handball player
- Stepfanie Kramer (born 1956), American actress and singer
- Steve Kramer (basketball) (born 1945), American basketball player
- Steve Kramer (actor) (born 1948), American voice actor
- Susan Kramer (born 1950), English politician, Liberal Democrat member of parliament
- Sven Kramer (born 1986), Dutch speed skater

=== T ===
- Theodor Kramer (1897–1958), Austrian poet
- Theodore L. Kramer (1847–1910), American Civil War soldier
- Thomas Kramer (born 1957), German-born real estate developer and venture capitalist
- Tim Kramer (1952 or 1958 – 1992), American porn star
- Tom Kramer (born 1968), American baseball pitcher
- Tommy Kramer (born 1955), American football quarterback
- Tosca Kramer (1903–1976), New Zealand-born American violinist and violist
- Trey Kramer (born 1988), American football player

=== V ===
- Vjekoslav Kramer (born 1976), Bosnian television chef

=== W ===
- Walter R. Kramer (1914–1995), U.S. badminton champion
- Wayne Kramer (guitarist) (1948–2024), American musician with the group MC5
- Wayne Kramer (filmmaker) (born 1965), South African screenwriter and film director
- Wilhelm Kramer (1801–1876), German otologist
- Wilhelm Heinrich Kramer (died 1765), German-born Austrian Hungarian botanist, physician and military surgeon
- William M. Kramer (1920–2004), American rabbi and art collector
- Wolfgang Kramer (born 1942), German game designer

=== Y ===
- Yep Kramer (born 1957), Dutch speed skater

== Fictional people ==
- Bernard Kramer, founder of Kramer Associates in Robert Sobel's alternate history novel For Want of a Nail
- Chas Kramer, a character played by Shia LaBeouf in the 2005 film Constantine (film)
- Cosmo Kramer, a character in the television series Seinfeld
- Jens Kramer, character on the German soap opera Verbotene Liebe
- John Kramer (Saw), a fictional character in the Saw film series; also known as Jigsaw
- Lisa Kramer, a character played by Debra Messing in the 2004 American romantic comedy film Along Came Polly
- Margaux Kramer, a character played by Ami Foster in the television sitcom Punky Brewster
- Rex Kramer, Danger Seeker, a character in the 1977 American comedy film The Kentucky Fried Movie
- Rex Kramer, a character in the 1980 American comedy film Airplane!
- Tromp Kramer, Afrikaner Detective in James McClure's Kramer and Zondi novels
- Ted, Joanna, and Billy Kramer, characters in the 1979 American drama film Kramer vs. Kramer portrayed by Dustin Hoffman, Meryl Streep, and Justin Henry

== Kramers ==
- Hendrik Anthony "Hans" Kramers (1894–1952), Dutch physicist, known for Kramers' law, Kramers' opacity law, Kramers theorem, Kramers–Heisenberg formula, Kramers–Kronig relations, and Kramers–Wannier duality.

== See also ==
- Cramer (surname)
- Cremer surname
- Krämer, surname
- Krammer (surname)
- Kraemer (surname)
- Krahmer, surname
- Kremer, surname
- Krmar, surname
- Kramarz
