= Kreder =

Kreder is a surname. Notable people with the surname include:

- Colette Kreder (1934–2022), French engineer, entrepreneur and feminist
- Michel Kreder (born 1987), Dutch road racing cyclist
- Raymond Kreder (born 1989), Dutch road racing cyclist
- Wesley Kreder (born 1990), Dutch road racing cyclist

== See also ==
- Kreher
- Kremer
- Reder
