= Kremer =

Kremer is a German, Dutch, and Jewish (Ashkenazic) surname cognate to Kramer.

== People ==
- Amy Kremer (born 1970/71), American Tea Party political activist
- Andrea Kremer (b. 1959), American television sports journalist
- Andrzej Kremer (1961–2010), Polish lawyer and diplomat, Deputy Minister of Foreign Affairs
- Anje Kremer (b. 1943), Dutch-born New Zealand speed skater
- Anne Kremer (b. 1975), Luxembourgish tennis player
- Annemarie Kremer (b. 1974), Dutch operatic soprano
- Arkadi Kremer (1865–1935), Russian socialist leader, founder of the Jewish Labour Bund, husband of Pati Kremer
- Armin Kremer (b. 1968), German rally driver
- Bob Kremer (b. 1936), American (Nebraska) politician
- Cecile B. Kremer, American Republican operative
- Daniel J. Kremer (b. 1937), American (Californian) justice
- Dean Kremer (b. 1996), Israeli-American baseball pitcher
- Felix A. Kremer (1872–1940), American lawyer and Progressive politician in Wisconsin
- George Kremer (1775–1854), American Jacksonian politician
- Gerard de Kremer (1512–1594), Flemish cartographer, geographer and cosmographer known as Gerardus Mercator
- Gidon Kremer (b. 1947), Latvian violinist and conductor
- Hans Kremer (b. 1954), German film actor
- Howard Kremer (b. 1971), American comedian
- I. Raymond Kremer (1921–1999), American attorney and judge in Philadelphia
- Isa Kremer (1887–1956), Russian-born soprano
- Jerry Kremer (b. 1935), American (New York) Democratic politician and attorney
- Jesse Kremer (b. 1977), American (Wisconsin) Republican politician
- Johann Kremer (1883–1965), German Nazi physician
- Joseph-François Kremer (b. 1954), French composer, conductor, cellist and musicologist
- Józef Kremer (1806–1875), Polish philosopher
- Ken Kremer (b. 1957), American football defensive tackle
- Kurt Kremer (b. 1956), German physicist
- Leon Kremer (1901–1941), Polish chess master
- Marcos Kremer (b. 1997), Argentine rugby player
- Marie Kremer (b. 1982), Belgian actress
- Maurice Kremer (1824–1907), American businessman and civil servant
- Max Kremer (b. 1969), German football forward
- Melissa Kremer (1996–2021), Dutch writer
- Michael Kremer (b. 1964), American development economist
- Mira Kremer (1905–1987), German chess master
- Mitzi Kremer (b. 1968), American swimmer
- Mykola Kremer, Ukrainian sprint canoer
- Naomie Kremer (b. 1953), Israeli-born American painter and video artist
- Pati Kremer (1867–1943), Russian revolutionary socialist, wife of Arkadi Kremer
- Paul Kremer (b. 1971), American modern painter
- Peter Kremer (b. 1958), German theatre and television actor
- Ray Kremer (1893–1965), American baseball pitcher
- René Kremer (1925–2002), Luxembourgian decathlete and handball player
- Romain Kremer (b. 1982), French fashion designer
- Stevie Kremer (b. 1982), American ski mountaineer and long-distance runner
- Theodore Kremer (1871–1923), German-born playwright
- Tom Kremer (1930–2017), Romanian game inventor and marketer
- Victor Kremer (1932–2010), Luxembourgian sports shooter
- Warren Kremer (1921–2003), American comics artist
- Willibert Kremer (1939–2021), German football player and coach
- Wolfgang Kremer (b. 1945), German swimmer

== See also ==
- Kremer prize, awarded to pioneers of human-powered flight; established by Henry Kremer
- Kremer Racing, a Cologne-based Porsche racing team founded by racer Erwin Kremer
- Kremers, surname
- Cremer (disambiguation)
- Kramer (disambiguation)
- Krämer
