= Kraemer (surname) =

Kraemer or Kræmer is a surname. Notable people with the name include:

== Kraemer ==
- Ado Kraemer (1898–1972), German chess master and problemist
- Augustin Kraemer (1865–1941), German naturalist and ethnographer
- Bob Kraemer (born 1950), Canadian football player
- Bror Kraemer (1900–1990), Finnish high jumper
- David C. Kraemer (active from 1990), American professor of Talmud and Rabbinics
- Elmer Kraemer (1898–1943), American colloid chemist
- Franz Kraemer (1914–1999), Canadian radio producer
- Fritz Kraemer (disambiguation)
- Harry Kraemer (born 1955), American business executive
- Helena Chmura Kraemer, American biostatistics professor
- Hendrik Kraemer (1888–1965), Dutch lay missiologist and figure in the ecumenical movement from Dutch Reformed Church
- Henry Kraemer (1868–1924), American professor of pharmacy
- Jacob Kraemer (born 1990), Canadian actor
- Jens Kraemer (born 1963), Canadian soccer player and coach
- Joe Kraemer (born 1964), American baseball pitcher
- Joe Kraemer (composer) (born 1971), American composer and conductor
- Nicholas Kraemer (born 1945), British harpsichordist and conductor
- Robert S. Kraemer (1928–2013), American aerospace engineer
- Samuel Kraemer, ranger, farmer, and businessman who is credited with much of the development of Anaheim, California during the 1920s
- Tommy Kraemer (born 1998), American football player
- Walter Kraemer (1892–1941), German politician

== Kræmer ==
- Lotten von Kræmer (1828–1912), Swedish baroness, writer, poet, philanthropist and women's rights activist
- Morten Kræmer (born 1967), Norwegian football defender

== See also ==
- Kramer (surname)
- Krämer, a German surname (Kraemer if written without diacritics)
