= Kraemer =

Kraemer may refer to:

- Kraemer (surname), includes a list of people with the name
- Kraemer, Louisiana, a U.S. census-designated place in Lafourche Parish
- Kraemer Textiles Inc., an American manufacturer that spins and sells yarns

== See also ==
- Kraemer House (disambiguation)
- Kramer (disambiguation)
