= Kremers =

Kremers is a German and Dutch surname, a variation of Kramer.

Kremers may refer to:

- Erwin Kremers (born 1949), German football (soccer) player
- Gidons Krēmers (born 1947), Latvian violinist and conductor
- Helmut Kremers (born 1949), German football (soccer) player
- Jimmy Kremers (born 1965), American baseball catcher
- Johan Kremers (born 1933), Dutch Commissioner of the province of Limburg
- Kris Kremers (1992–2014), one of two Dutch students who died while hiking in Panama
- Nienke Kremers (born 1985), Dutch field hockey player

== See also ==
- Kramer (disambiguation)
- Krämer
