= Charles Kramer =

Charles Kramer may refer to:

- Charles Kramer (attorney) (1916–1988), American attorney
- Charles Kramer (economist) (1907–1992), American economist, accused of being a spy for the Soviet Union
- Charles Kramer (politician) (1879–1943), Representative from California
- Charles Kramer (producer), American television producer

== See also ==
- Chas Kramer, a character in the film Constantine
