= Krmar =

Krmar is a surname. Notable people with the surname include:

- Igor Krmar (born 1991), Serbian footballer
- Milivoj Krmar (born 1997), Serbian footballer

== See also ==
- Kramar
- Kramer
- Kramarz
