= California Cars =

California Cars may refer to:

- California car (streetcar), a type of tram popularized in California
- California Car (railcar), coaches owned by Caltrans for operation by Amtrak
- CalCars, a non-profit organization promoting plug-in hybrid electric vehicles
