= Krämer =

Krämer (pronounced [ˈkʁɛːmɐ]), also transliterated Kraemer or infrequently Kreamer, is a German surname, originating from the Austrian term for "merchant". It may refer to:

- Ado Kraemer (1898–1972), German chess player
- Augustin Kraemer (1865–1941), German naturalist and ethnographer
- Bernd Krämer (born 1947), German computer scientist
- Bob Kraemer (born 1950), former Canadian Football League player
- Clementine Krämer (1873–1942), German writer and Jewish activist
- Franz Kraemer (1914–1999), Canadian radio producer
- Fritz G. A. Kraemer (1908–2003), German-American military educator and advisor
- Gudrun Krämer (born 1953), German scholar of Islamic history
- Helena Chmura Kraemer, American biostatistician
- Henry Kraemer (1868–1924), American pharmacognosist
- Jacob Kraemer (born 1990), Canadian actor
- Johann Victor Krämer (1861–1949), Austrian painter and photographer
- John Krämer, Carthusian writer of the fifteenth century
- Joe Kraemer (born 1964), former Major League Baseball pitcher
- Joe Kraemer (born 1971), American film score composer
- Josef Krämer (1878–1954), German gymnast, track and field athlete, and tug of war competitor
- Ingrid Krämer (born 1943), East German diver
- Ludwig Krämer (born 1939), legal figure in the development of environmental law
- Martin Krämer (born 1987), German chess grandmaster
- Michael Krämer (born 1985), German footballer
- Moritz Krämer (born 1980), Swiss singer-songwriter
- Nicholas Kraemer (born 1945), British harpsichordist and conductor
- Otto Maria Krämer (born 1964), German church musician
- Samuel Kraemer (1857–1937), American rancher, farmer, and businessman
- Stefan Krämer (born 1967), German football coach
- Walter Krämer (born 1948), German economist
- Werner Krämer (1940–2010), West German international footballer

== See also ==
- Kraemer (disambiguation)
- Kramer (disambiguation)
- Kreamer (disambiguation)
- Cramer (disambiguation)
- Cremer (disambiguation)
