= Kreher =

Kreher is a surname. Notable people with the surname include:

- Kristy Sullivan (née Kreher, born 1980), American volleyball player
- Louise Kreher, the co-founder of Louise Kreher Forest Ecology Preserve

== See also ==
- Kremer
