= Kreamer =

Kreamer may refer to:

- Kreamer, Pennsylvania, a census-designated place in Middlecreek Township, Snyder County, Pennsylvania, United States
- Kreamer Island, an island in Lake Okeechobee, Palm Beach County, Florida, United States

== People with the surname ==
- Anne Kreamer (born 1955), American journalist
- Barbara Osborn Kreamer (born 1948), American politician

== See also ==
- Krämer
