= Craft =

Skill performed manually

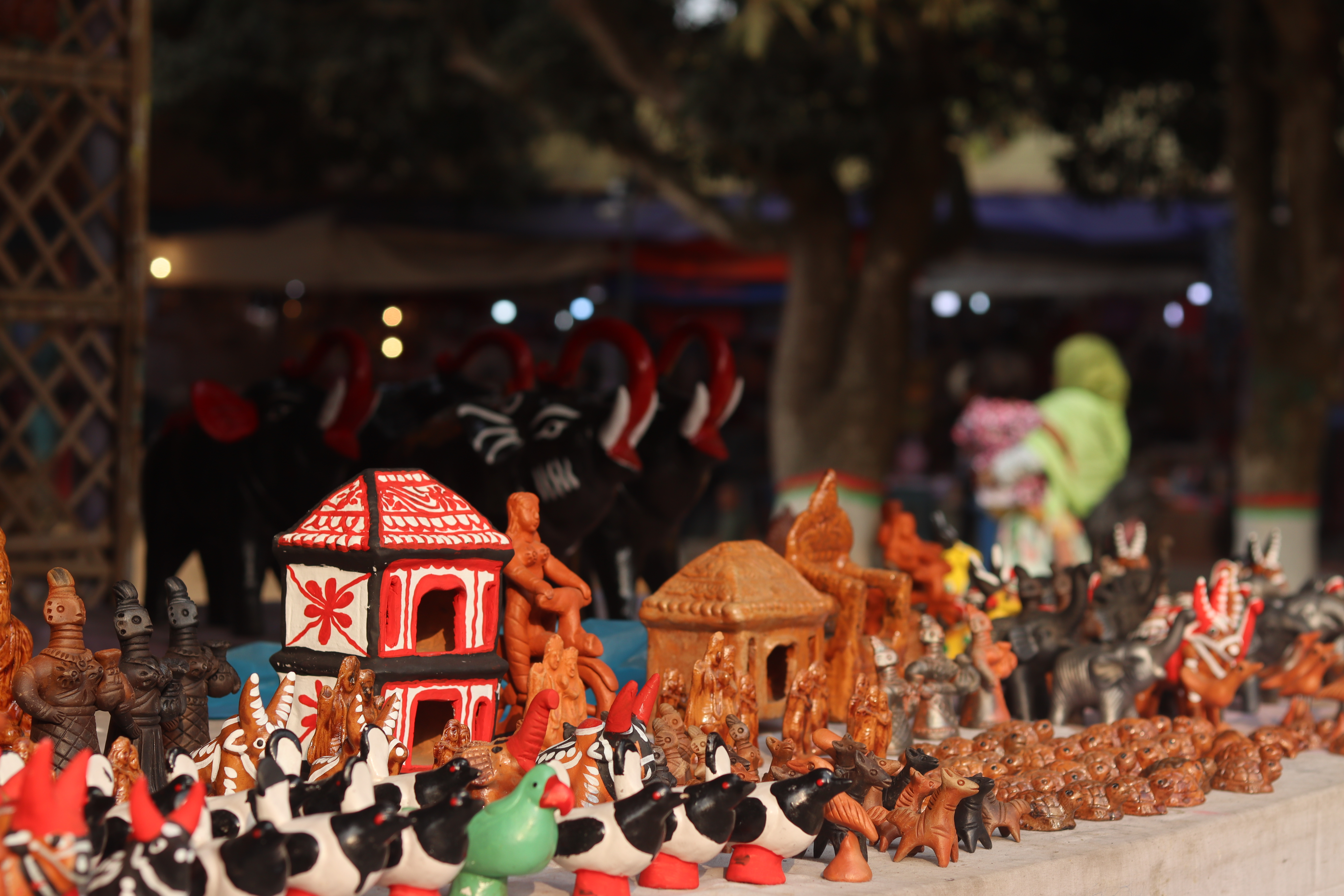
Craft fair in Sonargaon, Bangladesh

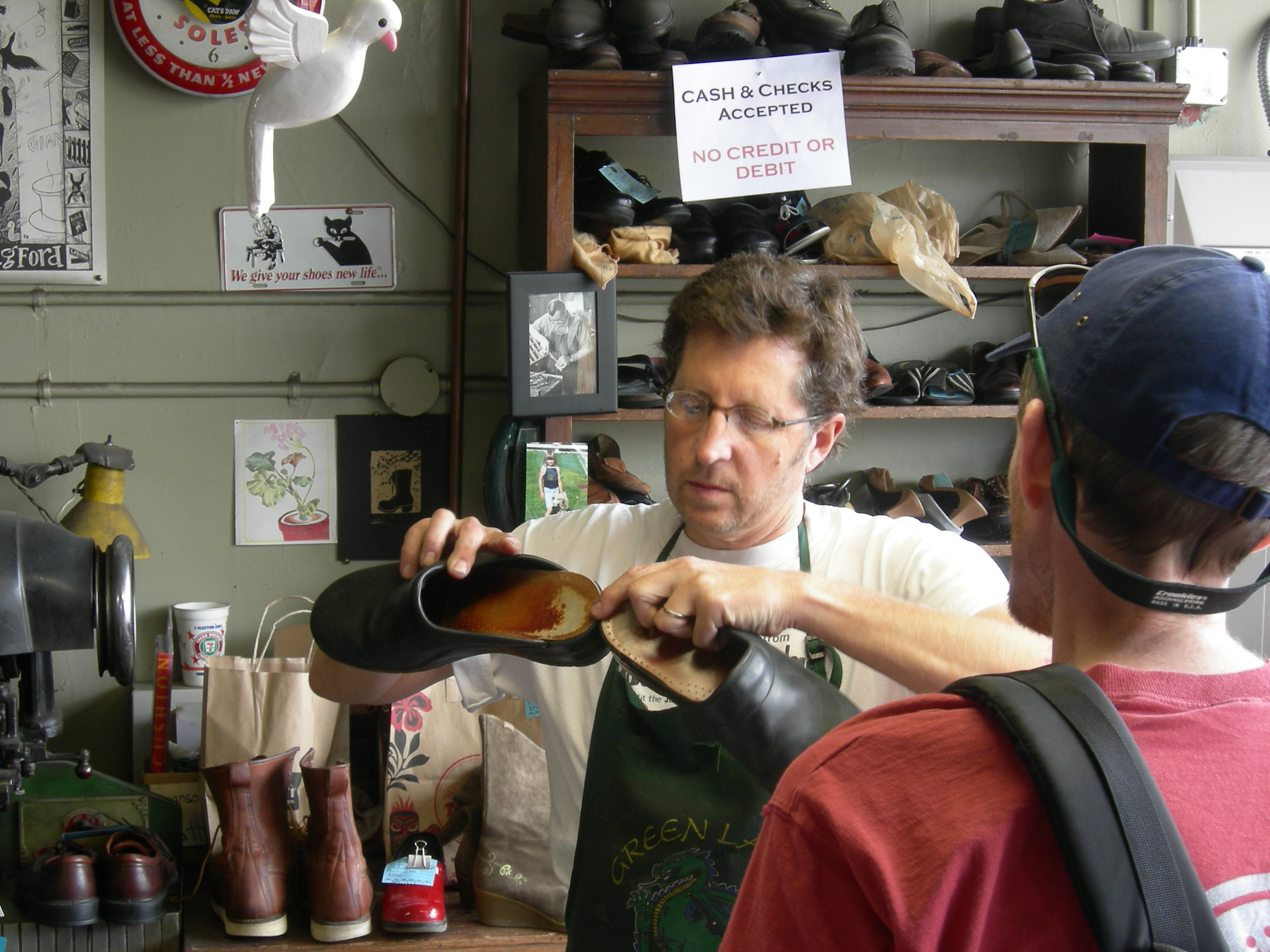
Shoes are repaired by a skilled shoemaker; here he evaluates a pair of shoes with a customer watching in Seattle, Washington, 2007

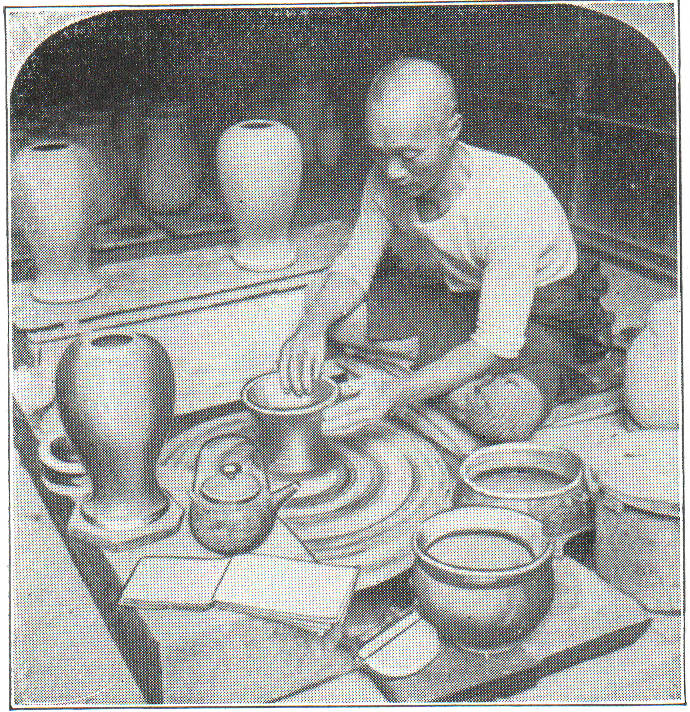
Japanese potter at his wheel (1914)

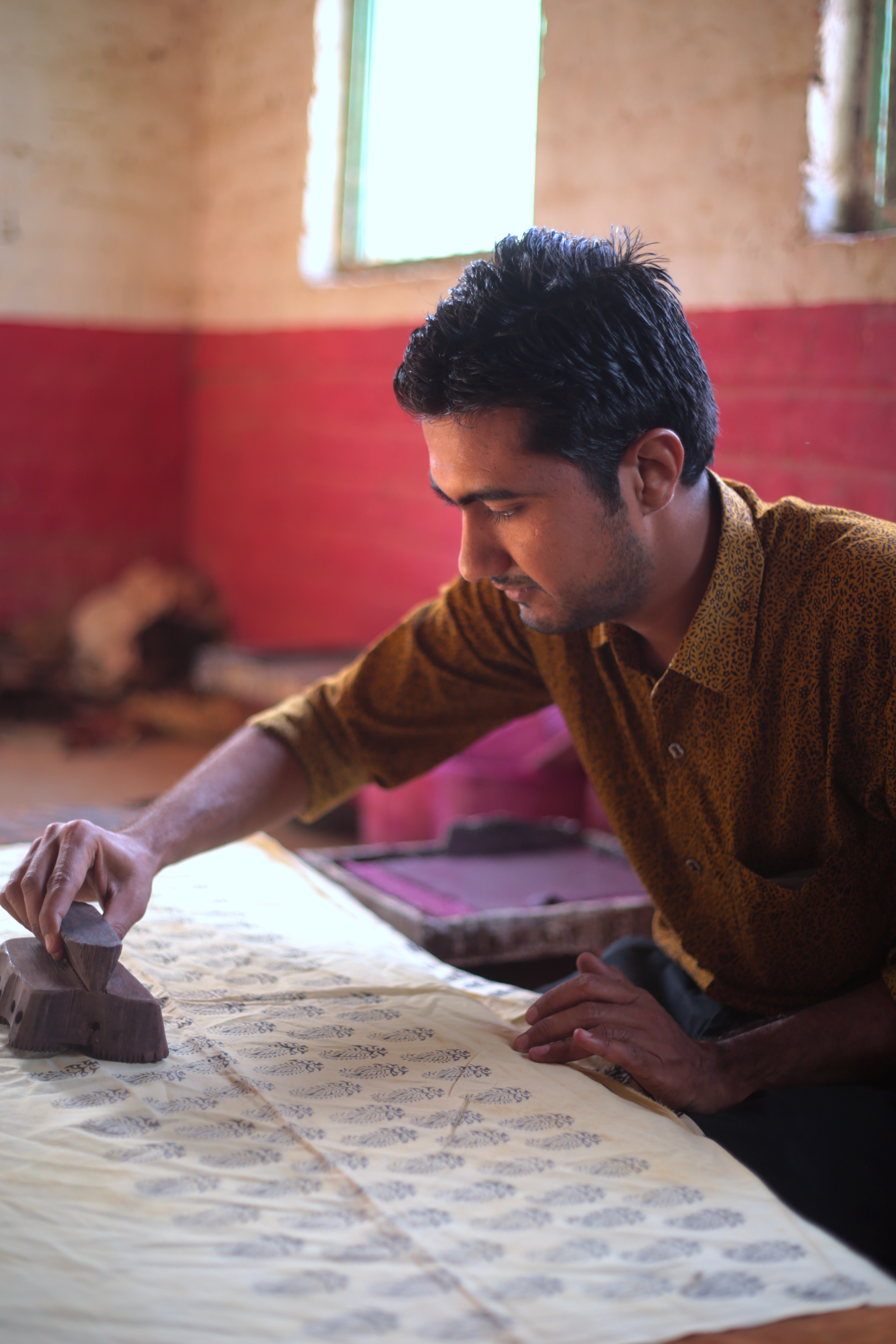
Bagh print traditional hand block print craft in India, 2016

A craft or trade is a pastime or an occupation that requires particular skills and knowledge of skilled work. In a historical sense, particularly the Middle Ages and earlier, the term is usually applied to people occupied in small scale production of goods, or their maintenance, for example by tinkers. The traditional term craftsman is nowadays often replaced by artisan and by craftsperson.

Historically, the more specialized crafts with high-value products tended to concentrate in urban centers and their practitioners formed craft guilds.

Their skills required an apprenticeship. Craftsmen and craftswomen had a higher status than the unskilled urban poor.

The skill required by their occupation and the need to be permanently involved in the exchange of goods often demanded a higher level of education, and craftspeople were usually in a more privileged position than the peasantry in societal hierarchy. The households of artisans were not as self-sufficient as those of people engaged in agricultural work, and therefore had to rely on the exchange of goods. Some crafts, especially in areas such as pottery, woodworking, and various stages of textile production, could be practiced on a part-time basis by those also working in agriculture, and often formed part of village life.

When an apprentice finished their apprenticeship, they became a journeyman searching for a place to set up their own shop and make a living. After setting up their own shop, they could then call themselves a master of their craft.

This stepwise approach to mastery of a craft, which includes the attainment of some education and skill, has survived in some countries to the present day. But crafts have undergone deep structural changes since and during the era of the Industrial Revolution. The mass production of goods by large-scale industry has limited crafts to market segments in which industry's modes of functioning or its mass-produced goods do not satisfy the preferences of potential buyers. As an outcome of these changes, craftspeople today increasingly make use of semi-finished components or materials and adapt these to their customers' requirements or demands. Thus, they participate in a certain division of labour between industry and craft.

== Nature of craft skill ==
The nature of craft skill and the process of its development are continually debated by philosophers, anthropologists, and cognitive scientists. Some scholars note that craft skill is marked by particular ways of experiencing tools and materials, whether by allowing tools to recede from focal awareness, perceiving tools and materials in terms of their practical interrelationships, or seeing aspects of work that are invisible to the untrained observer. Other scholars working on craft skill focus on observational learning and mimicry, exploring how learners visually parse the movements of experts. Certain researchers even de-emphasize the role of the individual craftsperson, noting the collective nature of craft understanding or emphasizing the role of materials as collaborators in the process of production.

== Classification ==
There are three aspects to human creativity: art, crafts, and science. Roughly, art relies upon intuitive sensing, vision, and expression; crafts upon sophisticated technique; and science upon knowledge.

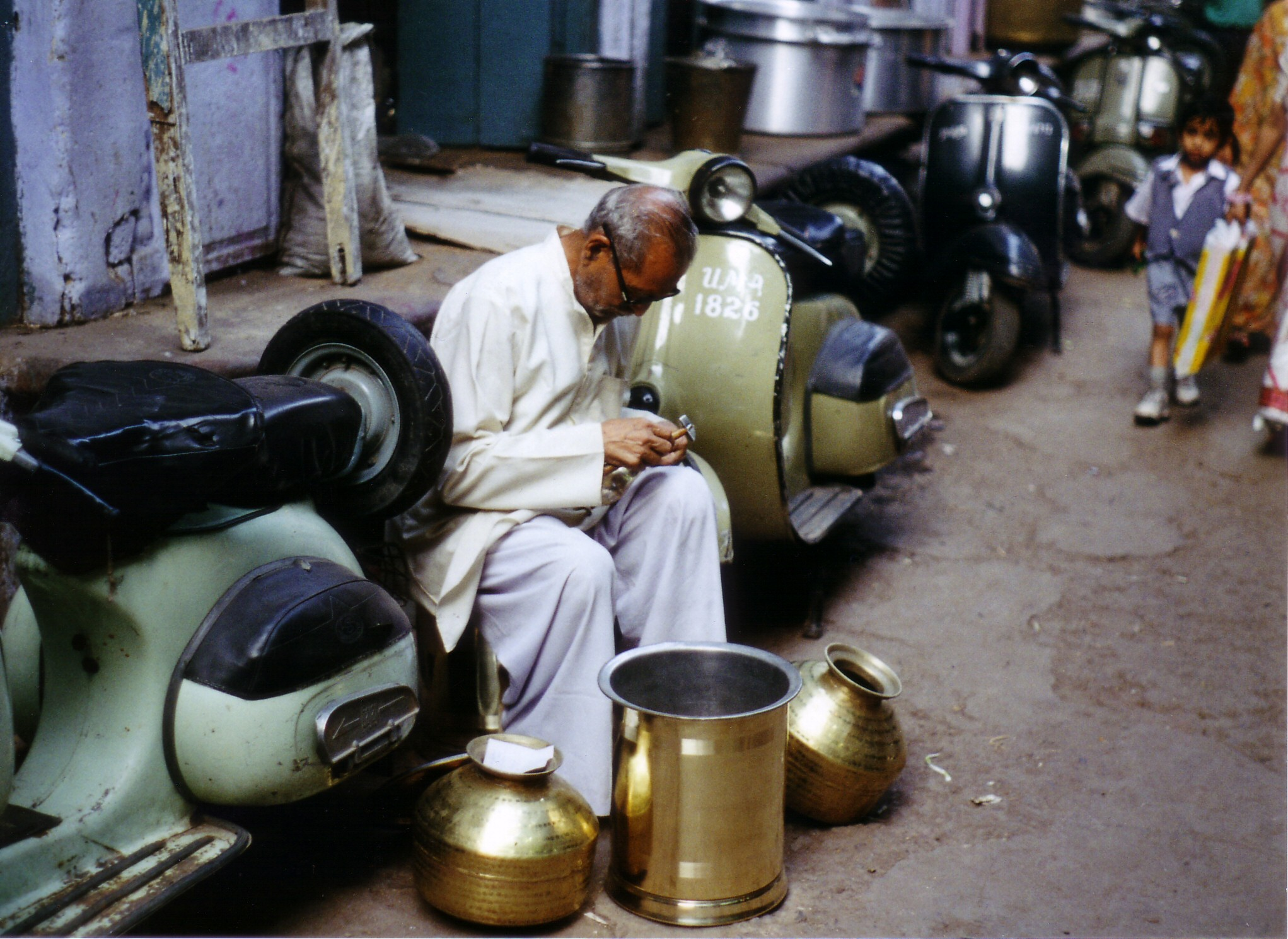
Street handicraft: here a skilled metalsmith in Agra, India sits between scooters in a commercial area making careful observations in the practice of his trade, 2005

=== Handicraft ===
Handicraft is the "traditional" main sector of the crafts. It is a type of work where useful and decorative devices are made completely by hand or by using only simple tools. The term is usually applied to traditional means of making goods. The individual artisanship of the items is a paramount criterion, an such items often have cultural and/or religious significance. Items made by mass production or machines are not handicraft goods.

The beginning of crafts in areas like the Ottoman Empire involved the governing bodies requiring members of the city who were skilled at creating goods to open shops in the center of town. These people slowly stopped acting as subsistence farmers (who created goods in their own homes to trade with neighbors) and began to represent what we think of as "craftspeople" today.

Besides traditional goods, handicraft contributes to the field of computing by combining craft practices with technology. For example, in 1968, the Apollo 8 spacecraft's core memory consisted of wires that were woven around and through electromagnetic cores by hand. The core rope memory they created contained information used to successfully complete the mission.

Crafts and craftspeople have become a subject of academic study. For example, Stephanie Bunn was an artist before she became an anthropologist, and she went on to develop an academic interest in the process of craft. She argues that what happens to an object before it becomes a "product" is an area worthy of study.

=== The Arts and Crafts Movement ===
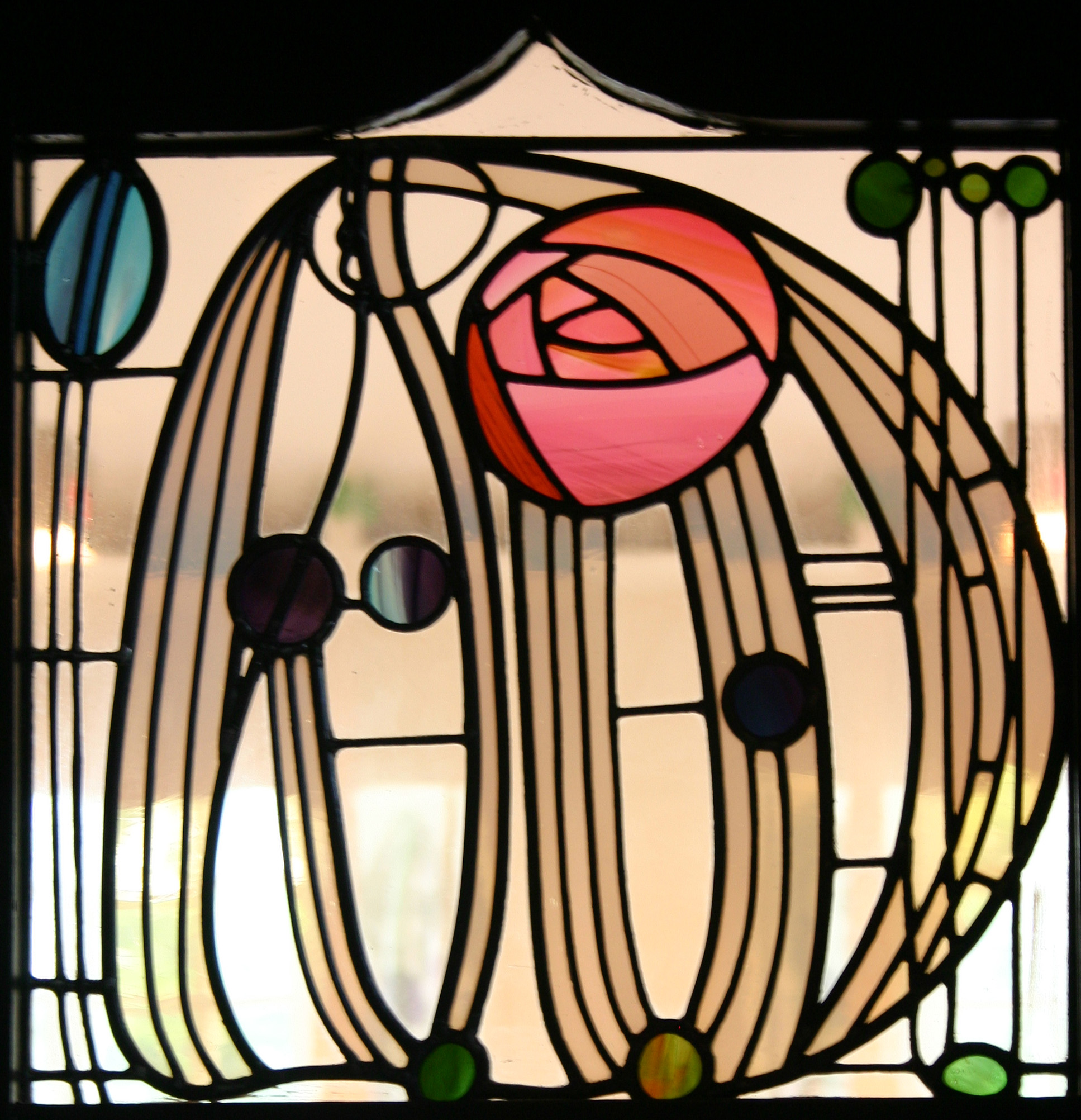
Stained glass window, The Hill House, Helensburgh, Scotland

The term crafts is used to describe artistic practices within the family of decorative arts that traditionally are defined by their relationship to functional or utilitarian products (such as sculptural forms in the vessel tradition) or by their use of such natural media as wood, clay, ceramics, glass, textiles, and metal.

The Arts and Crafts Movement originated in Britain during the late 19th century and was characterized by a style of decoration reminiscent of medieval times. The primary artist associated with the movement is William Morris, whose work was reinforced with writings from John Ruskin. The movement placed a high importance on the quality of craftsmanship, while emphasizing the importance for the arts to contribute to economic reform.

=== Studio crafts ===
Crafts practiced by independent artists working alone or in small groups are referred to as studio craft. Studio craft includes studio pottery, metalwork, weaving, woodturning, paper and other forms of woodworking, glassblowing, and glass art.

=== Craft fairs ===
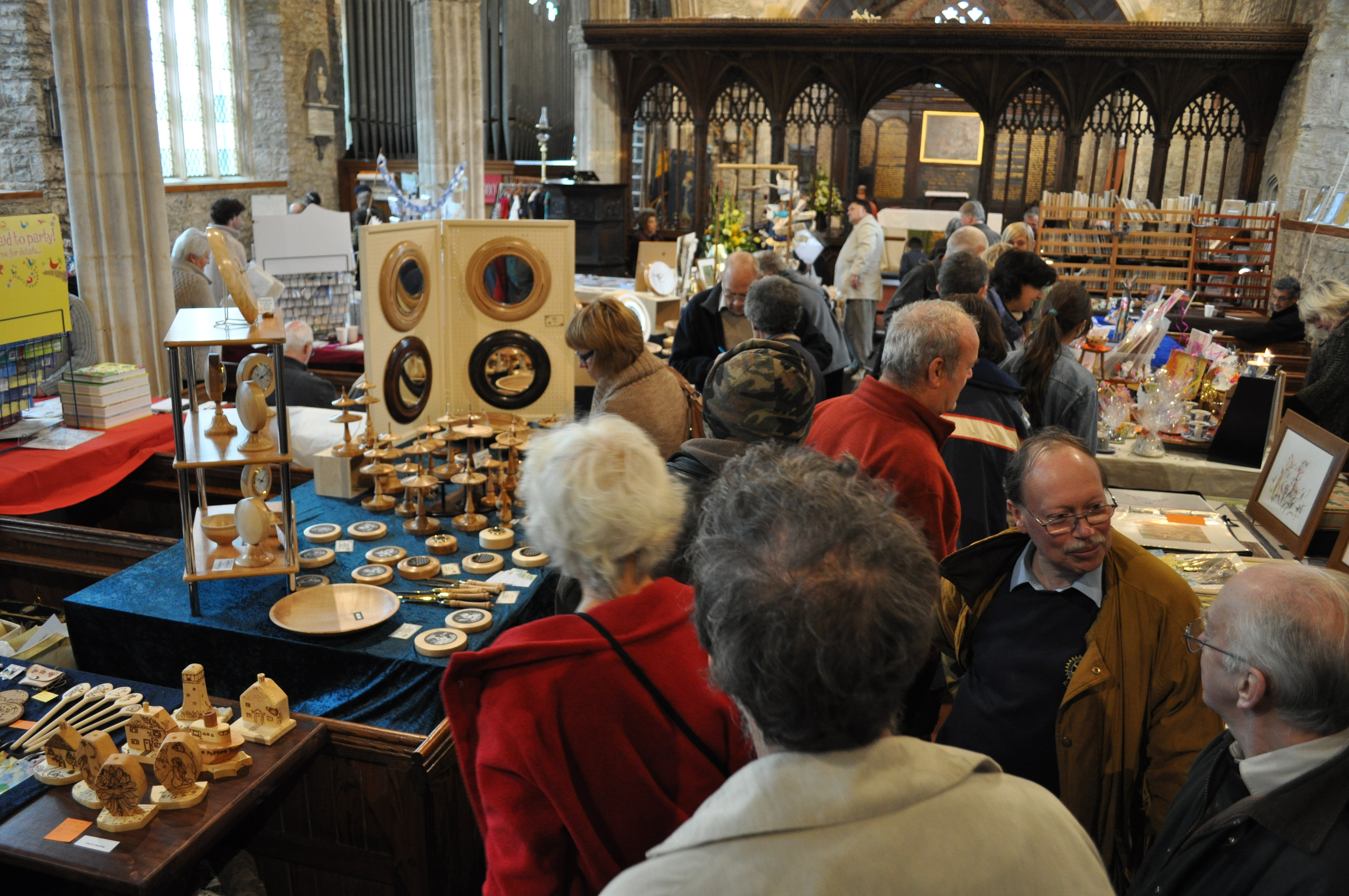
Craft fair in Bampton, UK

A craft fair is an organized event to display and sell crafts. Along with miscallaneous craft fairs, there are also craft stores where goods are sold and craft "communities", such as Craftster, where expertise is shared and discussion of craft takes place.

=== Tradesperson ===
A tradesperson is a skilled manual worker in a particular trade or craft, with a high degree of both practical and theoretical knowledge of their trade. In cultures where professional careers are highly prized, there can be a shortage of skilled manual workers, leading to lucrative niche markets in the trades.

== See also ==
- Apprenticeship – Training for trades
- Artisan – Skilled craft worker who makes or creates things by hand
- Arts and crafts – Item production entirely by hand or with simple tools
- Arts and Crafts movement – Design movement (c. 1880–1920)
- Bagh print – Traditional Indian wood block printing
- Bagru print – Traditional hand block printing of Bagru, India
- Craft production – Factory where products are hand-made
- Crafting (gaming) – Creating items, buildings, armor, weapons, etc. in a video game
- Decorative arts – Design and manufacture of functional, beautiful objects
- Fully feathered basket – Basket-ware made in Northern California
- Guild – Association of artisans or merchants
- Japanese craft – Handicrafts of Japan
- Journeyman – Skilled worker who has successfully completed an official apprenticeship
- Master craftsman – Occupational rank
- Otium – Leisure time in ancient Roman culture
- Pallet crafts – Crafts and projects which use discarded wooden shipping pallets
- Profession – Vocation founded upon specialized educational training
- Semiprofession – Skilled occupation short of profession
- Simple commodity production – Concept in economic theory
- Vocation – Occupation to which a person is especially drawn or for which they are especially suited
- Weaving – Technology for the production of textiles

=== Communities ===
- American Craft Council – National non-profitable organization
- Chamber of commerce – Organization for the promotion of business interests
- Craft Northern Ireland – Regional development agency for crafts
- Crafts Council – United Kingdom charity for craft
- Crafts Council of British Columbia – Non-profit organization in British Columbia
- General Society of Mechanics and Tradesmen of the City of New York – Educational and cultural association (founded 1785)
- Heritage Crafts Association – Charitable organisation in the UK
- Japan Kōgei Association – Japanese cultural heritage organization
- Pike Place Market – Public market in Seattle, Washington
- Street Artists Program of San Francisco – Municipal arts program
