= Krahmer =

Krahmer is a surname. Notable people with the surname include:

- Carlo Krahmer (1914–1976), British jazz drummer and record producer
- Holger Krahmer (born 1970), German politician and Member of the European Parliament with the Free Democratic Party of Germany
- Jello Krahmer (born 1995), German Greco-Roman wrestler

== See also ==
- Carel Frederik Krahmer de Bichin (1787–1830), Dutch artillery officer
- Kramer (disambiguation)
