= Dawn Kramer =

American artistic director (born 1945)

- Born: 1945 (age 80–81); New York
- Occupations: Dancer, choreographer
- Years active: 1967–present
- Website: dawnkramer.info

Dawn Kramer is a choreographer, performer, artistic director, and teacher based in Boston, MA. She is notable as an experimental artist combining movement, props, environments, and interactive video. She is a professor emeritus in the Studio for Interrelated Media at the Massachusetts College of Art and Design. She inspired generations of interdisciplinary artists with her classes, particularly the course "On The Spot", which many remember as transformative. Currently, Dawn creates & performs in site-specific videos, and travels extensively.

== Biography ==
In 2012, the Massachusetts Cultural Council awarded Dawn Kramer an Artist Fellowship in Choreography. This is the sixth fellowship that the Commonwealth has awarded her since she established her career base in Boston. The grant enabled Kramer and Stephen Buck to create seven site-specific performance videos in Ireland, France, and Sicily during a sabbatical semester. These seven short videos were shown in the Paine Gallery in Boston in 2013. Kramer's live choreography has appeared on 15' high scaffolding (Pipe Dream) and vast rope nets (After Ever), in sites as varied as the Back Bay Train Station and the stairway of the Boston Public Library. Her work has been performed at Jacob's Pillow, Dance Theatre Workshop in NYC, and in the Netherlands, Belgium, Germany, and France as well as throughout New England.

Since 2007, Kramer and Stephen Buck have been collaborating on pieces involving live performance and video projections on the performers. Body of Water premiered June, 2011 in the Pozen Center and Godine gallery at Massachusetts College of Art and Design. The work included installation of six silent video/movement poems, two videos by Buck and live performance by Kramer in a video projection environment. Cracking premiered April 12, 2008 at the Pozen Center at Massachusetts College of Art and Design. It was later performed at Boston University and Jordan Hall. Katarina Miljkovic created the music, with performance by Kramer and video and lighting by Stephen Buck. This trio's second collaboration, Entanglement, was presented by the Cambridge Science Festival and Cyberarts in April and May, 2009. Kramer's current choreography uses video projections on the performer(s) to reflect on the nature of choice, the relationship of body to self, age and gender, and to question the idea of the self as a solid, separate reality.

In 2010, Kramer was awarded the Marilyn Pappas faculty grant from the MassArt Foundation to assist her visit to Kyoto where she made three silent video/movement poems in temple gardens. The Bogliasco Foundation assisted her creation of Body of Water with a residency in Italy in fall, 2010. All these pieces envision the human being as a small, non-dominant, or integrated element of Nature.

Kramer received several grants and awards from the National Endowment for the Arts, the Massachusetts Cultural Council and Artists Foundation, the LEF Foundation, among others. A grant from the French Ministry of Culture enabled a three-month residency at the La Napoule Art Foundation in France. There she collaborated with international artists and created an evening of solo work called, Vous Etes Ici! Ms. Kramer had the pleasure of performing in Meredith Monk's Celebration Service in Cambridge and in From the Horse's Mouth at Jacob's Pillow and Brandeis University. In 2007-2008, Kramer appeared as "Ishtar" in John Holland's Lament for a Dead Companion in Boston and New York performances.

== Early life ==
Dawn started dancing in the basement with her mother, to the radio, when she was four. She choreographed her first dance at five and performed for anyone who would watch. Admitted to her first formal dance class in kindergarten, because she knew her right from her left, her first "starring" role at six was as "the Princess Who Didn't Know How to Dance." Kramer graduated from White Plains High School with highest honors in 1963. She was a scholarship student at the Martha Graham Center of Contemporary Dance in New York City in the early 60's. Kramer attended Wellesley College from 1963 to 65, transferred to Sarah Lawrence College and earned a BA in dance/performing arts from Sarah Lawrence in 1967 where she studied with the late, renowned Bessie Schonberg. She performed with Liz Keen's company at the Judson Church and with Muriel Manings in the late 60's, both in New York. After a year in San Francisco, Kramer moved to Boston in 1970 with her then husband and young son. In 1973, she co-founded Dance Collective and gave birth to her daughter in 1974.

== Dance Collective ==
Dawn Kramer is a founder of Dance Collective which she co-directed for thirty years, creating and/or performing in approximately seventy works. In addition to Kramer, the significant forces in the company were Martha Armstrong Gary, Susan Dowling, Ruth Wheeler, Judith Chaffee, and Micki Taylor-Pinney. Dance Collective's mission was to bring quality contemporary dance to a wide variety of audiences in various settings and to provide educational programs to people of all ages and abilities. The Summer Outreach Program and Intergenerational Company gave urban teens the chance to work alongside professional dancers, creating a program that toured the summer camps of Boston, performing for and teaching thousands of youngsters each summer. That program has morphed into the Reach! program at Boston University, spearheaded by Micki Taylor-Pinney.

In addition to programs of works by several Dance Collective choreographers, the company assisted full-evening works by individual artistic directors. Kramer's first full-evening, site specific piece, Point of View, moved up the stairway and into the windowsills of the old ICA building in Boston. Her other full-evening works involved large interactive sets designed by Dutch designer, Pieter Smit. In Foreign Fling, she climbed a mountain of defunct TV's and electronics. In One False Move, she and Smit "built" a roller coaster of a path to a height of 12' above the stage, singing, speaking several languages, and moving all the while. In After Ever, the dancers climbed, rolled, and flung themselves onto and through a hand-knotted rope net (18'x22') which dropped into the Cyclorama, bisecting the circular performance space.

== Artistic philosophy ==
Kramer's current work envisions the human being as a small, non-dominant, integrated part of the natural environment. In videos as well as in live performances in projection environments, she explores the porous boundaries of "self."(See descriptions of specific pieces.)

During the 70's and 80's, Kramer's work often used ordinary objects from everyday life as physical, metaphorical, and expressive extensions of the performers. Works like Rag, Blue Cheer, Housewares, Conversation Piece, Pressed for Time, and Bits & Pieces reflected aspects of her life as a mother of young children, in often humorous and fractured ways. Works such as Rest Area, Intervals of Heavy Rain, Cameo, the videodance "My Place/or Yours?" and "What We Here Possess" looked at love relationships in various forms and stages. Many of Kramer's large scale works in the late 80's and 90's were presented by Dance Umbrella, in particular Pipe Dream and After Ever which were designed specifically for the huge round Cyclorama building at the Boston Center for the Arts. Choreography such as Raw Stuff (1985), Reach (1993), and Shout! (2000) explored pure movement, each in a distinct way.

=== Collaboration ===
Dawn has prioritized collaboration as a mainstay of her artistic practice. Over the years, she has collaborated with the following artists:

Choreographers

- Judith Chaffee, Martha Armstrong Gray, and Micki Taylor-Pinney of Dance Collective
- Seán Curran
- Peter DiMuro

Composers

- Antony Flackett
- Fast Forward
- John Holland
- Katarina Miljkovic
- David Moss
- Kevin Pelrine
- Yuval Ron
- Caleb Sampson
- Laetitia Sonami
- Stan Strickland
- Jeff Talman
- Patino Vasquez

Musicians

- Melanie Almiron
- John Clark
- Jeff Davis
- Bridget Fitzgerald
- Evan Harlan
- Ron Heifitz
- Randall Hodgkinson
- Wanetta Jackson
- Christopher O'Reilly
- Merle Perkins
- Annie Silberman
- Sid Smart

Visual Artists/Designers

- Carol Anthony
- Bebe Beard
- Kate Blacker
- Stephen Buck
- Candace Fleming
- Sara Marhamo
- Carol Ramsey
- Pieter Smit

Video Artists

- Stephen Buck
- Joe Briganti
- Robin Doty
- Antony Flackett
- Corey Smithson
- Noah Stout

Poets

- Malek Alloula
- Steven Ratiner

== Notable Performances ==
=== Body of Water (2011) ===
Body of Water is a two part video installation. It begins with single channel projections on three screens showing several silent video-movement poems made in different parts of the world, including the coast of Maine, Kyoto, Japan, Westwood, Massachusetts and the Ligurean coast of Italy. These short site-specific videos envision the human figure at a small scale or more embedded in our marine/terrestrial environment, thus imagining a better balance between the two.

It is followed by a performance by Dawn Kramer in a video projection environment. Body of Water explores the delicate relationship between human beings and the sea. The earth's surface is covered with about 71% water, with less than 1% of it available to support all living things. The human body is filled with 55%-78% water that is remarkably similar to seawater in its chemical composition. Humans and the sea are deeply connected, yet the negative human impact on our oceans has been vast. The work also continues exploring the mysteries of Buddhist philosophy, questioning the boundaries of "self."

Stephen Buck manipulated video imagery through Isadora software and composer Antony Flackett aka DJ Flack added some music for the piece. Sara Marhamo (Industrial Stitchers Guild) created the costumes.

Body of Water was started in a residency at the Liguria Study Center where Kramer was a Fellow of the Bogliasco Foundation in the Fall of 2010 and continued with the support of the Studio for Interrelated Media at Massachusetts College of Art and Design and the MassArt Foundation.

=== Mercy (1993) ===
The most compelling work on the program was "Mercy," a new solo for Kramer that examined - with both humor and poignancy - the increasing violence against women. Kramer began the dance dressed in only a bra and pantyhose, and in a reverse striptease, slowly added other undergarments, some clutched between her teeth, others wrapped around her head and legs . Women, Kramer appeared to say, are trapped in a web of society's own images and expectations. As the dance ended and the mournful score grew in intensity, Kramer appeared visibly moved by her own performance. It was a powerful and intimate moment." --Andrew Dreyfus, The Boston Herald, June 2, 1993.

Mercy references the title of Andrea Dworkin's controversial book. The dance is a reverse striptease to Hungarian folk music. It uses the layering and binding of underwear worn in odd ways as a metaphor for restrictions and violence against women. It is a challenging piece to perform, both physically and emotionally. Mercy makes some audience members uncomfortable as it is a somewhat graphic look at the often hidden problem of domestic violence.

=== Imaginary Crossing (1980) ===
Body movements and camera movements are marvelously harmonious...the dancer appears to work within the dimension of a video-space (and not a theatrical space)... Through a combination of pacing, eye contacts, close-up camera work, compelling rhythms, mystery and power, the work inexorably draws the viewer under its own mantle. Sensual appeal, symbolic suggestion and metaphor are employed in ways to suggest many layers of meaning, and, most importantly, convey the feeling of a probing intellect, a joint exploration, a meld of perception and body movement...It is this sense of thoughtful inquiry into both the form and content of television that is most provocative and challenging -- Kramer-Doty's joint effort to find a "perfect" and true visual syntax for the natural properties of the television medium.

— David H. Katzive (former) Director, DeCordova and Dana Museum and Park, 25 January 1982

== Reviews ==
- Boston Herald, 3 November 2001, Walk in Progress, Theodore Bales "Dance Review"
- Boston Globe, 2000, Swan Song #1, Karen Campbell "Arts Dance Review: Dance Collective a Conspiracy of Dances Delivers Artistic Delight"
- Boston Globe, 1998, 25th Anniversary Dance Collective Concert, Christine Temin "Dance Review At 25, Collective shows brainy energy"
- Bay Windows, 1997, Green St., T.J. Medreck "The Ties that Bind"
- Boston Globe, 1983, 10th Anniversary Dance Collective Concert, Christine Temin "Dance Collective gala marks troupe's 10th year"
