= Craftster =

Craftser
- Website type: Craft content / online community
- Founded: May 2000; 26 years ago
- Headquarters: El Segundo, California, {{{location_country}}}
- Website: http://www.craftster.org/
- Advertising: Yes
- Current status: closed
- Website closed on December 19, 2019

Craftster was an online community for crafting and do it yourself (DIY) enthusiasts. Users posted pictures of craft projects, and others commented and asked questions about how it was made.

The Craftster.org website closed on December 19, 2019.

The site's tagline, "No tea cozies without irony", referred to the fact that many of the projects posted are irreverent, off-beat, humorous, clever, etc. While projects posted on the site tended to be made using traditional techniques such as knitting, crochet, cross stitch and sewing they often conveyed modern sentiments such as images of a favorite rock band, or motifs from a favorite 1980s video game.

The site had over 190,000 registered members. It has been written up in publications such as Time, The New York Times, The Guardian, and The Washington Post. The membership was over 190,000, and readership was over 1,000,000 unique visitors per month and over 10,000,000-page views per month.

The site has been called be one of the forces behind the renaissance of crafting among a new, young, contemporary demographic.

== History ==
The site was started on June 27, 2003, by crafter and computer programmer Leah Kramer. The term "Craftster" is a portmanteau of "crafty hipster" and a nod to pioneering peer-to-peer sites Napster and Friendster. Prior to starting the site, Kramer was one of the organizers of the Boston Bazaar Bizarre, a yearly "punk rock craft fair", begun in 2001.
