= Krammer (surname) =

Krammer is a surname. Notable people with the surname include:

- Alfred Krammer, Austrian sprint canoeist
- Anton Krammer (1929–1986), Austrian footballer
- Arnold Krammer, American historian
- Christa Krammer (born 1944), Austrian politician
- Günter Krammer, West German sprint canoeist
- Nico Krämmer (born 1992), German ice hockey player
- Peter H. Krammer (born 1946), German immunologist
- Thomas Krammer (born 1983), Austrian football player

== See also ==
- Kramer (disambiguation)
