= Port-map =

Two-stroke engine diagram

In two-stroke engine technology, a port map is a diagram which shows the ports that are cut into the cylinder of an engine. A port-map can be useful to determine opening/closing-timing and the area of specific ports. These diagrams are usually represented as a rolled out cylinder where the width equals the circumference and the height equals the stroke plus the cylinder skirt, the ports are outlined.

== See also ==
- Kramer graph
