= Felix Kramer =

American businessman

- Education: Cornell University
- Occupations: Entrepreneur, advocate, writer
- Known for: Founding CalCars.org, promoting plug-in vehicles

Felix Kramer is an American entrepreneur, strategist, and writer. After a succession of jobs and projects in the nonprofit sector and an early internet startup, he gained attention after 2002 as the founder of the California Cars Initiative, promoting mass production of plug-in hybrid electric vehicles. Since 2009, he has written broadly on climate change awareness and solutions, and collaborated on or co-founded climate-related projects.

== Early life and education ==
Felix Kramer grew up in the New York metropolitan area.

He received his bachelor's degree in American Studies from Cornell University in January 1971. At college and after, he was active in anti-Vietnam war and draft resistance activities.

== Career ==
=== Early career ===
Kramer first worked as a Congressional aide and a writer/editor and director for several environmental organizations, including the New York event of the national Sun Day event in 1978 and the NYC Energy Task Force, known for its wind and solar installations on low-income buildings.

=== Personal computer and early internet-era activity ===
With the arrival of WYSIWYG computers and software and laser printing, he co-founded the New York Macintosh User Group's DTP Special Interest Group. In 1984 he started Kramer Communications, one of New York City's first start-to-finish desktop publishing (DTP) companies; he sold the company in 1997.

Kramer became involved in fax broadcasting and then with business development, usability and online marketing and promotion for a series of early online startups. In 1997, as he relocated to the San Francisco Bay Area, Kramer founded eConstructors.com, an online marketplace for the web design and development industry, featuring "WhoBuiltIt," the first online reverse directory for websites. He built the company with a small international staff, raised angel funding and remained as CEO until it was bought in early 2001.

=== Plug-in car advocacy ===
In 2001, interrupted by surgery for an acoustic neuroma, Kramer moved his focus from high-tech back to his earlier environmental concerns. He approached Amory Lovins of the Rocky Mountain Institute (RMI), and entered into discussions with RMI-spinoff HyperCar to advance its concept of a fully optimized, 99 mile/gallon, fuel-cell-powered SUV. He proposed a pre-purchase "demand-pull" model for financing the company. This evolved into what became the California Cars Initiative, which led the successful campaign for commercialization of plug-in hybrid electric vehicles.

In 2006, with a conversion by one of the independent conversion companies, Kramer became the "world's first non-technical consumer owner" of a PHEV. He flew that vehicle to Washington DC in May 2006 for the first public viewing of a PHEV on Capitol Hill. Within four years, many of the major automakers began to offer some type of plug-in hybrid or all-electric vehicle, beginning with the Chevrolet Volt.

Author and New York Times columnist Thomas Friedman acknowledges Kramer's role in promoting the idea of plug-in hybrid vehicles, calling him someone "who has made plug-in electric cars not only his passion but an imminent reality."

=== Climate change activities ===
His activities and writing about global warming emerged from his work on plug-in cars as he focused on powering electric vehicles by renewable energy. He began including the issue in testimony and articles in 2004. After 2009, Kramer focused on writing and organizing about climate change awareness and solutions, working with groups such as 350.org, Environmental Entrepreneurs—E2.org, the Citizens' Climate Lobby and the Sierra Club, and advising and investing in cleantech and clean energy companies.

In 2014, he started Beyond Cassandra, a "mini-think tank" for projects, ideas, campaigns, and initiatives about climate change.

In mid-2016, he cofounded The ClimateCongress Wikipedia Project, a 501(c)3 project to assemble on an independent wiki what candidates and incumbents in the House and Senate say and do about climate change. The project, with volunteers, a core team, and crowdsourcers, aims to identify a subset of information to move eventually to Wikipedia. It expects to evolve into ClimatePolitics, expanding to state, regional and local officeholders and appointees. In late 2016, he founded Climate.MBA, a project to promote Emergency Climate Teach-Ins at business schools.

== Publications and public presentations ==
Using knowledge gained in the DTP business and his early editorial experience, Kramer co-authored (with Maggie Lovaas) an early book on electronic publishing as a business in 1990 & 1991. The book, Desktop Publishing Success: How to Start and Run a Desktop Publishing Business, sold 25,000 copies in seven reprintings and was widely reviewed, including acclaim as "the Bible of the DTP Biz" by Publish Magazine's editor-in-chief.

Much of his writing on plug-in cars was distributed via the CalCars Yahoo! news-group news-letter, copies of which are archived on CalCars' website.

On climate change and clean energy, he has authored or co-authored with renewable energy experts and advocates, including Dan Kammen, Gil Friend, and Hunter Lovins, op-ed pieces for the Huffington Post, the San Jose Mercury-News, Salon, Grist, Alternet, The Guardian and the Houston Chronicle.

Kramer has spoken extensively at energy and policy events in the U.S. and internationally.
