= Vjekoslav Kramer =

Bosnian chef (born 1976)

- Born: Vjekoslav Kramer; 2 August 1976 (age 48); Travnik, SR Bosnia and Herzegovina, SFR Yugoslavia
- Culinary career
- Cooking style: Fresh and Organic, Italian cuisine, Bosnian cuisine

Vjekoslav Kramer is a Bosnian chef, reality television participant, and media personality known for his food-focused television shows. Vjeko Kramer was born in Travnik but moved to Osijek where he completed both elementary and high school. He then moved to Zagreb, where he attended the Higher catering school, passed the exam and got a master's degree becoming a master chef.

He has been a media personality for the past few years. His first experiences are associated with the new TV show Searching for Croatian Naked Chef, where he won in the competition against 800 candidates. For the past three years he has been working on Televizija OBN, a Bosnia and Herzegovina TV station, where he proved himself as an energetic TV host who attracts viewers with his spontaneity and sense of humor.

In 2012, Vjeko became one of the first Bosnia and Herzegovina celebrities who came out as a gay. He is currently the editor and host of OBN Television's culinary show called Pots and Pans (Bosnian: Lonci i Poklopci).
