= Kramer =

Kramer is a Dutch and Low German word for a small merchant, hawker, or retailer and is a common occupational surname. The word may refer to:

== People ==
- Kramer (surname)
  - Cosmo Kramer, a fictional character from the American sitcom Seinfeld, usually referred to as just "Kramer"
  - Kramer (musician), a musician and record producer

== Places ==
- Kramer, California, U.S.
- Kramer, Indiana, U.S.
- Kramer, North Dakota, U.S.
- Kramer, Nebraska, U.S.
- Kramer (Ochsenhausen), a district of the city Ochsenhausen, Baden-Württemberg, Germany
- Kramerspitz, a mountain in Bavaria, Germany

== Companies ==
- Kramer Company, a German manufacturer of compact construction machines
- Kramer of New York (1943–1980), a jewelry company based in New York City
- Kramer Electronics, Ltd., an international electronics company
- Kramer Guitars, an American guitar company

== Other uses ==
- 5715 Kramer, an asteroid
- Kramer graph, a two-stroke engine port area graph
- Kramer vs. Kramer, a 1979 American film, Academy Award winner for Best Picture
- Kramer station, a Capital MetroRail station in Austin, Texas
- Raymond C. and Mildred Kramer House, in New York City

== See also ==
- Cramer (disambiguation)
- Cremer
- Kraemer (disambiguation)
- Krammer, body of water in Volkerak, Netherlands
- Kremer (disambiguation)
