= Kieran Kramer =

American novelist

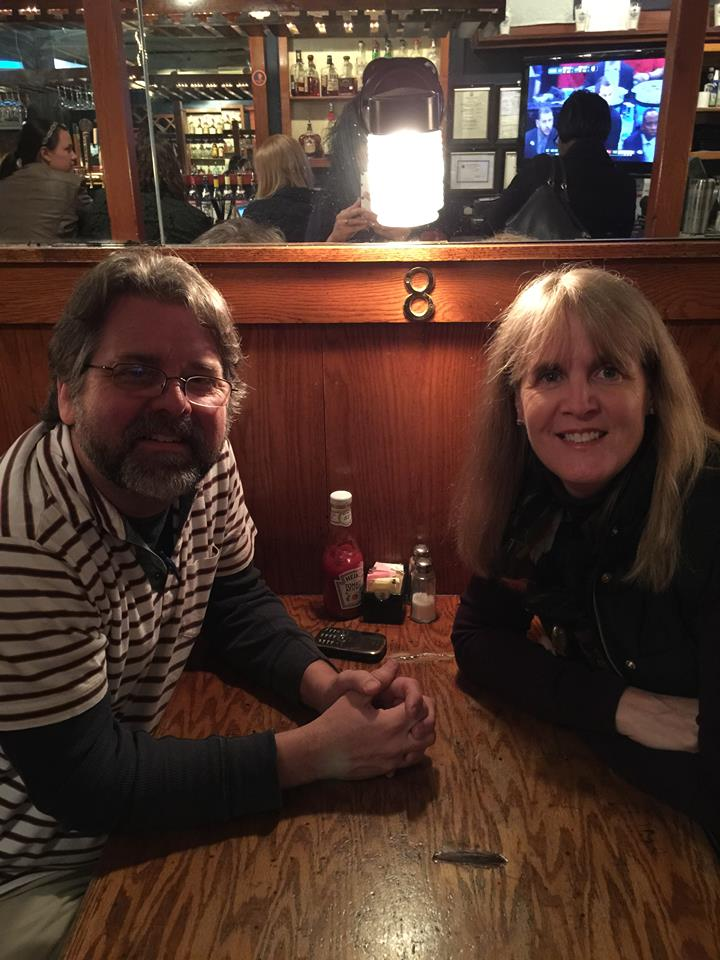
Kieran Kramer at The Virginian restaurant on The Corner in Charlottesville, Virginia, March 2015, with Ned Hartley

Kieran Kramer is an American author of historical romance novels. Her Impossible Bachelors books are a series of Regency romances.

Her book When Harry Met Molly won the 2010 First Historical Romance Award from the Romantic Times.

== Bibliography ==
- When Harry Met Molly, St. Martin’s Press, 2010
- Dukes to the Left of Me, Princes to the Right, St. Martin’s Press, 2010
- Cloudy with a Chance of Marriage, St. Martin’s Press, 2011
- If You Give a Girl a Viscount, St. Martin’s Press, 2011
- Loving Lady Marcia, St. Martin’s Press, 2012
- The Earl Is Mine, St. Martin’s Press, 2013
- Say Yes to the Duke, St. Martin’s Press, 2013
- Sweet Talk Me, St. Martin’s Press, 2014
- You're So Fine, St. Martin’s Press, 2015
- Trouble When You Walked In, St. Martin’s Press, 2015
- A Wedding At Two Love Lane, St. Martin's Press, 2017
