= Kramer of New York =

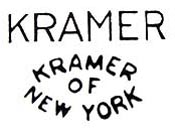
Kramer of New York Mark

Kramer of New York was a jewellery company formerly located 393 5th Avenue in Manhattan, New York City, New York..

Jeweller Louis Kramer founded the company in 1943. Although the company ceased operations in 1980, Kramer of New York is still a well-respected name and collected costume jewelry line today.

== Products ==
Kramer of New York produced some of the world's leading costume jewelry at the time.

Pieces created by the company used sparkling Austrian crystals, and also high quality rhinestones..

== Marketing ==
Kramer marketed its jewelry under a variety of marks including "Kramer of NY", "Kramer of NY City", "Kramer".

When it made jewelry for Christian Dior, "Christian Dior by Kramer".

Trademarks owned by the company included "Amourelle", "Perles De Lune", "The Diamond Look", "Dura-Gold", "KJC" and "The Golden Look".

== See also ==
- American jewellers
- Companies based in Manhattan
