= Otto Maria Krämer =

German organist and church musician (born 1964)

- Born: 1964 (age 61–62); Germany
- Education: Folkwang Hochschule; Robert Schumann Hochschule Düsseldorf
- Occupations: Organist; cantor; music educator
- Years active: 1993–present
- Employer: Westminster Choir College
- Style: Church music

Otto Maria Krämer (born 1964) is a German organist, church musician, and music educator.

Krämer studied at the Folkwang Hochschule, Essen and the Robert Schumann Hochschule Düsseldorf. His teacher was Wolfgang Seifen. In 1994, he passed his examination (A). Since 1993, he has worked as cantor and organist in Straelen. In 1995, he won the first prize of the Concours d'Improvisation a l'orgue Montbrison. He was the teacher of improvisation at the Westminster Choir College in Princeton, New Jersey.

== Compositions ==
- "Fünf sinfonische Momente für Orgel"
- "Prélude et Fugue dansée sur le nom Gaston"
- "Messe brève"
- "Subvenite"
- "Exultate"
- "Missa Festiva"
