= Shalom Kramer =

Israeli editor and literary critic

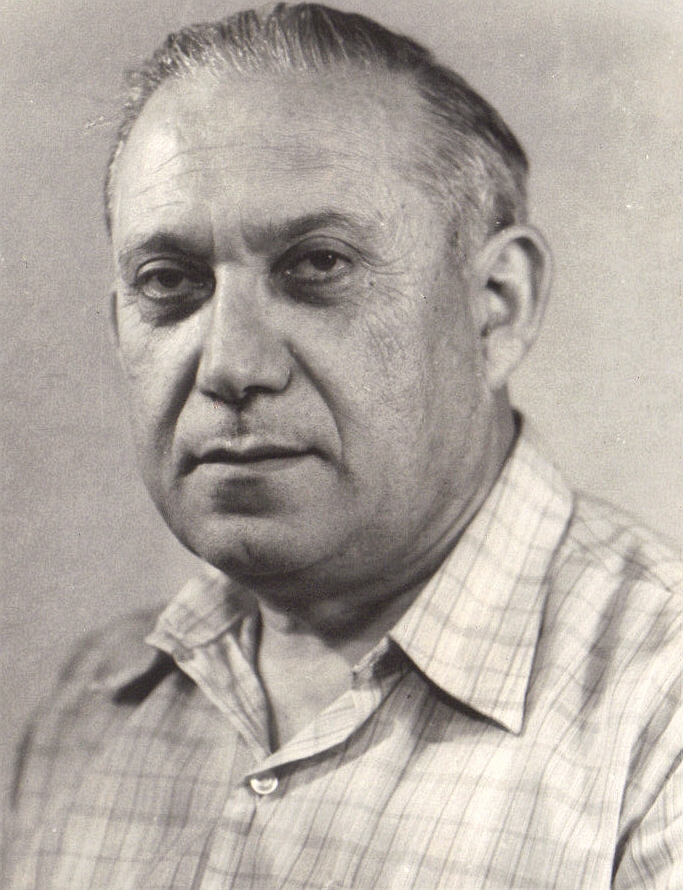
Shalom Kramer

Shalom Kramer (Hebrew: שלום קרמר; May 31, 1912 – October 3, 1978), was an Israeli essayist, editor and literary critic.

== Biography ==
Shalom Kramer was born in Sanok, Galicia, which was transferred from the Austro-Hungarian Empire to Poland after World War I. His father, Shlomo (Solomon) Kramer, was a manufacturer of juices and vinegar, one of the largest employers of the city, and a leader of the Young Mizrachi Movement in Galicia. Kramer grew up in Sanok and studied in a cheder (a religious primary school) and a Polish primary school until 1925. From 1925 to 1931 he attended Takhkemoni Rabbinical School in Warsaw, along with his friend Abba Ben-David (later the first language consultant of the Israel Broadcasting Authority). There, he acquired a Jewish and general education and was ordained as a rabbi. In 1931-32 he studied for a Polish matriculation certificate in Vilna, and from 1932 to 1933 he studied law at the University of Lwow.

In November 1934, he immigrated to Mandatory Palestine, where he pursued undergraduate and graduate degrees in Hebrew Literature, Hebrew Language and Philosophy at the Hebrew University of Jerusalem, His dissertation, which he did not complete, was on the life and work of David Frishman. He supported himself with work in construction and as a surveyor.

Kramer was one of the first people in the Jewish Yishuv (pre-state Jewish community) to learn about the murder of the Jews of Europe. Opposing the line taken by the newspaper to downplay this information, Kramer resigned and joined the British army in May 1942, serving for two years. During the Holocaust, many members of his family perished, including his father Shlomo and his brother and sister.

He died in 1978, leaving his widow, three children, and ten grandchildren.

== Teaching and journalism career ==
In 1944 he moved to Kiryat Haim, a suburb of Haifa, where he taught Hebrew subjects in secondary schools. In 1940-42 he worked as a news editor for the daily newspaper Davar.

In 1953 he returned to Jerusalem and taught Hebrew literature at Beit Hinukh high school. From 1955 until his death in 1978, he taught literature at David Yellin College of Education.

Kramer was the editor of the radio program, “A Minute of Hebrew.” He was an active member of the Hebrew Writers Association in Israel.

== Literary criticism ==
In 1984, the Bialik Institute published Kramer's Frishman the Critic, with an introduction by Avinoam Barshai. Barshai wrote: "Shalom Kramer was one of the Hebrew essayists and critics who marked their writing with a powerful personal impression. His essays are essentially profiles, in which the image of novelists, poets, critics, and publicists throbs... In his comprehensive essays, his ability to convey the nature of the author and his writing to his readers stands out. In many of the essays he examined the social background that served as the author's literary matrix, taking note of the relation between the writer and his social environment. For this reason he preferred realism in literary writing ... Though when he discussed any writer he was usually capable of directing himself to the essence of the subject of his criticism, seeking to understand him according to his own tendencies in his creation.

In the introduction to On Criticism and Critics: Chapters on the History of Hebrew Criticism, a posthumous edition of Kramer's writing (published by the Hebrew Writers' Association, in cooperation with Eked, 1980), editor Haim Toren, wrote: “These essays on eighteen critics and those on 'The Limits of Criticism' and 'Pathways in Hebrew Criticism,' are the product of the work and study of a critic and essayist, a man of culture and stature. They provide excellent material for scholars and students, who wish to expand and deepen their knowledge of the history and development of Hebrew criticism, both its struggles and its victories... This book, along with those that Kramer published during his lifetime, reveals a creative figure, who managed to illuminate, explain, and analyze literary works, and literary, social, and educational problems with the intuition of a fine pedagogue, a man of good taste, reason, good judgment, and high standards, who expressed himself in deep-rooted, clear, and polished Hebrew style.

In the introduction to A Minute of Hebrew (published by the Ministry of Education and Culture, the Department of Adult Education, 1980), Abba Bendavid wrote: “Shalom Kramer was an outstanding man of literature and an enthusiastic teacher. In every area of his activity – literary criticism, teaching, and education – he showed what was beautiful, important, and unique in literary works to his readers and listeners, making the works attractive to them... He did not write in the dry, professional style of experts in literature but rather with the colorful expressiveness of a true author.”

== Awards and recognition ==
In 1970 he won the Wallenrod Prize, awarded for work published in Moznayim, the journal of the Hebrew Writers Association, of which he was an editor.

== Published works ==
Below are English translations of the titles of his works, which are all in Hebrew.

- The Rejected Critic (1946), on the life of Abraham Uri Kovner.
- The Changing of the Guard in our Literature (1959).
- Realism and its Breakdown: on Hebrew Authors from Gnessin to Appelfeld (1968).
- Changes in the Language of David Frishman (1973).
- The Language of Authors: I. Yakov Klatzkin; II. Dov Sadan (1975).
- Faces and Manner: Essays on Poetry and Poets (1976), “From Bialik and Tchernichovsky to Dan Pagis.”

=== Posthumous ===
- On Criticism and Critics: Chapters in the History of Hebrew Criticism (1980).
- A Minute of Hebrew: a Selection of Language Lessons Broadcast on the Voice of Israel (1980).

Frishman the Critic, a Monograph (1980).

=== As an editor ===
Kramer edited volumes of Peretz Smolenskin, Moshe Leib Lilienblum, Sh. Shalom, Yehoshua Tan-Pai, Y. H. Ravnitzky, and Shlomo Shpan.
