= Kristy Kreher Sullivan =

American volleyball player (born 1980)

- Born: October 27, 1980 (age 46); Birmingham, MI
- Occupation: College volleyball
- Known for: Notre Dame Records

Kristy Kreher Sullivan (born October 27, 1980) is an American volleyball player. She played for the Notre Dame Fighting Irish as a collegiate player.

== Biography ==
=== Early life and education ===
Kristy Kreher was born to Pete and Julie Kreher on October 27, 1980. Raised in the Detroit metropolitan area, she attended Marian High School in Bloomfield Hills, Michigan, where she was a three time all-state honoree and finished as the school's career leader in kills after she recorded 627 as a senior. She went on to study at the University of Notre Dame, earning a finance degree from the university's Mendoza College of Business. She also earned an MBA from Eastern Michigan University.

=== College volleyball career ===
As a freshman, Kreher was a Big East Conference all-rookie team selection (1998). She played in 28 of 31 matches and led the Irish to a first-round NCAA tournament victory over Eastern Washington University with her first career triple double (24 kills, 14 assists and 14 digs). She recorded six double-digit kill matches and hit over .500 in six matches.

As a sophomore, she was a second team all-Big East selection (1999). She played in all 29 matches, and started in 28. She recorded seven double-double matches and led the team in kills five times. She earned all-tournament honors during the Big Orange Bash at Clemson University, and was one of 20 players chosen for the 1999 USA Volleyball Junior National team.

As a junior, Kreher was an All-Big East first-team selection (2000). She finished second on the team in kills with 440, and scored double-digit kills in 21 of the team's 31 matches. In 24 of the matches, she posted a hitting percentage better than .320, including a .591 mark vs. Saint Louis and had five 20-plus kill matches, four of them against ranked teams. She scored 19 kills at Florida State University to earn the Lady Seminole Classic Most Valuable Player Award. Kristy Kreher (1998-2001) also was one of just 20 players named to the USA Junior National Team in 2000.

As a senior in 2001, Kreher was an all-Big East first-team unanimous selection, and was Big East player of the week three times. She ended her career ranked second on the all-time hitting percentage list with a .306 career mark (1,215 K, 391 E, 2694 att.), seventh all-time in career kills (1,215), fifth all-time in kill average (3.23 per game). She led the team in kills 32 times in her career (ninth all-time) and recorded 70 double-digit kill matches, which is tied for third all-time. She posted nine 20-plus kill matches in her career and enjoyed five double-double matches (kills - digs) in 2001.

=== Career ===
Kreher played for the Minnesota Chill until financial issues caused the league to dissolve. She then went to work for Ford Motor Company and is currently employed with Nissan Motors North America.

She is married to Dave Sullivan of Ann Arbor, Michigan, an auto analyst at AutoPacific, where the couple resides with their three children.
