= Jeff Talman =

Jeff Talman (born 1954 in Greensburg, Pennsylvania) is a contemporary artist who works in a variety of media including sound, light, video installation, sculpture, graphics and photography.

== Career ==
Talman graduated with BA and MA degrees in Music Composition from the City College of New York. He later studied at Columbia University, where he began using computers for sound composition in 1984. He also taught and conducted orchestras at both schools. He has lived in New York City since 1976.

Though trained as a composer of chamber and orchestral music, Talman switched modes of presentation after an extended stay in Europe. His repeated visits to the Cathedral of St. Vitus in Prague in 1996-97 provided important insight regarding architectural sound. Talman determined that the ambient sound of a space, the Room Tone, is sufficient to activate the resonance of the space, which provides unique sonic perceptual data of the site.

After two years of experimentation with recordings of spatial sound, Talman's installation “Vanishing Point 1.1” (1999) was presented at St. Paul's Chapel at Columbia University. This work featured the site's resonance, extracted from a recording of its ambient room tone, amplified, treated as a compositional element and returned to the space in multi-channel sound. Since then Talman has produced numerous works that feature this unique resonance-composition and feedback technique. The installations, at times, also incorporate resonant sculpture, video projection and other visual objects.

Installation sites have included Cathedral Square (Domplatte) in Cologne, Germany, St. James Cathedral in Chicago, the Bavarian Forest, a wind turbine site in Åland, Finland, the MIT Media Lab, The Kitchen, Eyebeam, bitforms gallery in New York City and others.

== Awards ==
Talman is a 2006 recipient of a John Simon Guggenheim Foundation Fellowship in Sound Art, a 2003 recipient of a New York Foundation for the Arts Fellowship in Computer Art and a 2016 recipient of The Gregory Millard Fellowship from the New York Foundation for the Arts in Music/Sound. He has been awarded numerous residencies including those at Yaddo, the Liguria Study Center in Bogliasco, Italy, the MacDowell Colony, the Virginia Center for the Creative Arts, the Oberpfälzer Künstlerhaus in Schwandorf, Germany and the Künstlerhaus Krems in Krems, Austria.
