= Cramer =

Cramer may refer to:

== Businesses ==
- Cramer brothers, 18th century publishers
- Cramer Systems, a software company
- Cramer & Co., a former musical-related business in London

== Mathematics ==
- Cramer's rule, a formula for the solution of a system of linear equations

== Other uses ==
- Cramer (surname), including a list of people and fictional characters
- Cramer, Minnesota, United States, an unincorporated community
- Mount Cramer, Idaho, United States

== See also ==
- Cremer
- Kramer (disambiguation)
