= Kraemer Textiles Inc. =

American yarn manufacturing company

Kraemer Textiles Inc. is a privately held American yarn manufacturing company founded in 1887, based in Nazareth, Pennsylvania. It produces its own handicraft yarns under the Kraemer Yarns brand, and spins natural and manmade fibers for carpets, industrial use, and home furnishings. It was one of the companies partnered with the Ralph Lauren Corporation to produce the distinctive outerwear for the 2014 Winter Olympics team representing the United States.

Kraemer Hosiery Mills was founded in 1887 by Henry Kraemer and became a leading women's silk hosiery manufacturer. In 1907, the company was purchased by the Schmidt family, and ownership has remained in the family for multiple generations. The Kraemer name was retained as it was established in the marketplace, and became known as Kraemer Textiles. After World War II, spinning machines were installed that produced synthetic yarns for clothing, drapes, and upholstery. Clients in the 1960s and 1970s included Burlington Industries and Mohawk Industries, and later military contracts.

In the late 1980s, the company's business slowed as textile production fell in the United States due to overseas sourcing becoming less costly and therefore more desirable to buyers. In 1987, a plant was purchased in Berks County, Pennsylvania but the debt created by the purchase eventually led to the company having to file for Chapter 11 bankruptcy. Over the years, production dropped from 300,000 pounds of yarn at its peak, to 50,000 per week in 2007 and annual revenues dropped from $20 million in 1997 to around $5 million in 2007.

However, another source of revenue was introduced with the creation of the Kraemer Yarns handicraft lines in 2005, taking advantage of the increased nationwide interest in crochet and knitting. This was the first time the company created and manufactured its own brand of yarns versus providing products for other companies. Kraemer also appealed to home dyers by marketing a selection of undyed yarns composed of various blends of fibers such as kid mohair, superwash Merino wool, organic cotton, linen and silk.

The company joined with the Ralph Lauren Corporation in making sweaters for the US Olympic Team seen during the opening of the 2014 Winter Olympics. Previously, the Corporation received negative press when it was found to have sourced the clothing it supplied to the athletes in 2012 from China, so it vowed to source everything it produced for the 2014 Olympics from the US. Kraemer spun around 6,000 pounds of Merino wool yarn from a ranch in Oregon, which was then sent to a dyer in North Carolina. The yarn amounted to approximately one-fourth of a standard week's production at the mill. David Schmidt, the President of Kraemer Yarns, said he and his 50 employees were proud to have been a part of the production.
