= CalCars =

US non-profit organization

The California Cars Initiative
- Founder: Felix Kramer
- Location: Palo Alto, California
- Origins: 2002; 24 years ago
- Website: http://www.calcars.org/

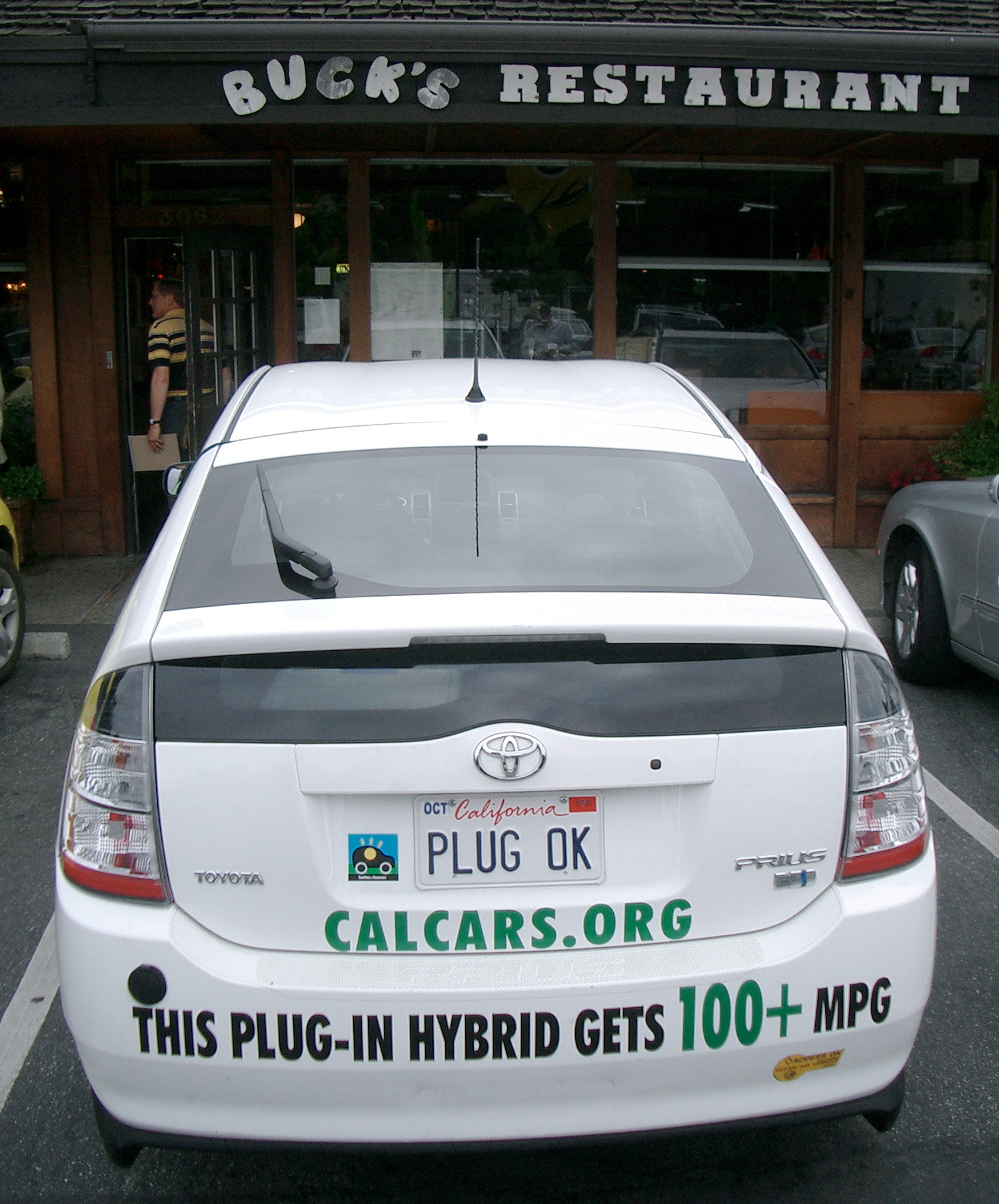
Toyota Prius plug-in hybrid converted by CalCars with a fuel economy of over 100 miles per gallon

CalCars (also known as The California Cars Initiative) was a charitable, non-profit organization founded in 2002 to promote plug-in hybrid electric vehicles (PHEVs) as a key to addressing oil dependence and global warming both nationally and internationally. It was active until 2010, when the first mass-produced PHEVs arrived. CalCars envisioned millions of plug-in hybrid electric vehicles, charged by off-peak electricity from renewable energy sources, and with their internal combustion engines powered by low-carbon alternative fuels, as a way to significantly reduce greenhouse gases that come from transportation.

== History ==
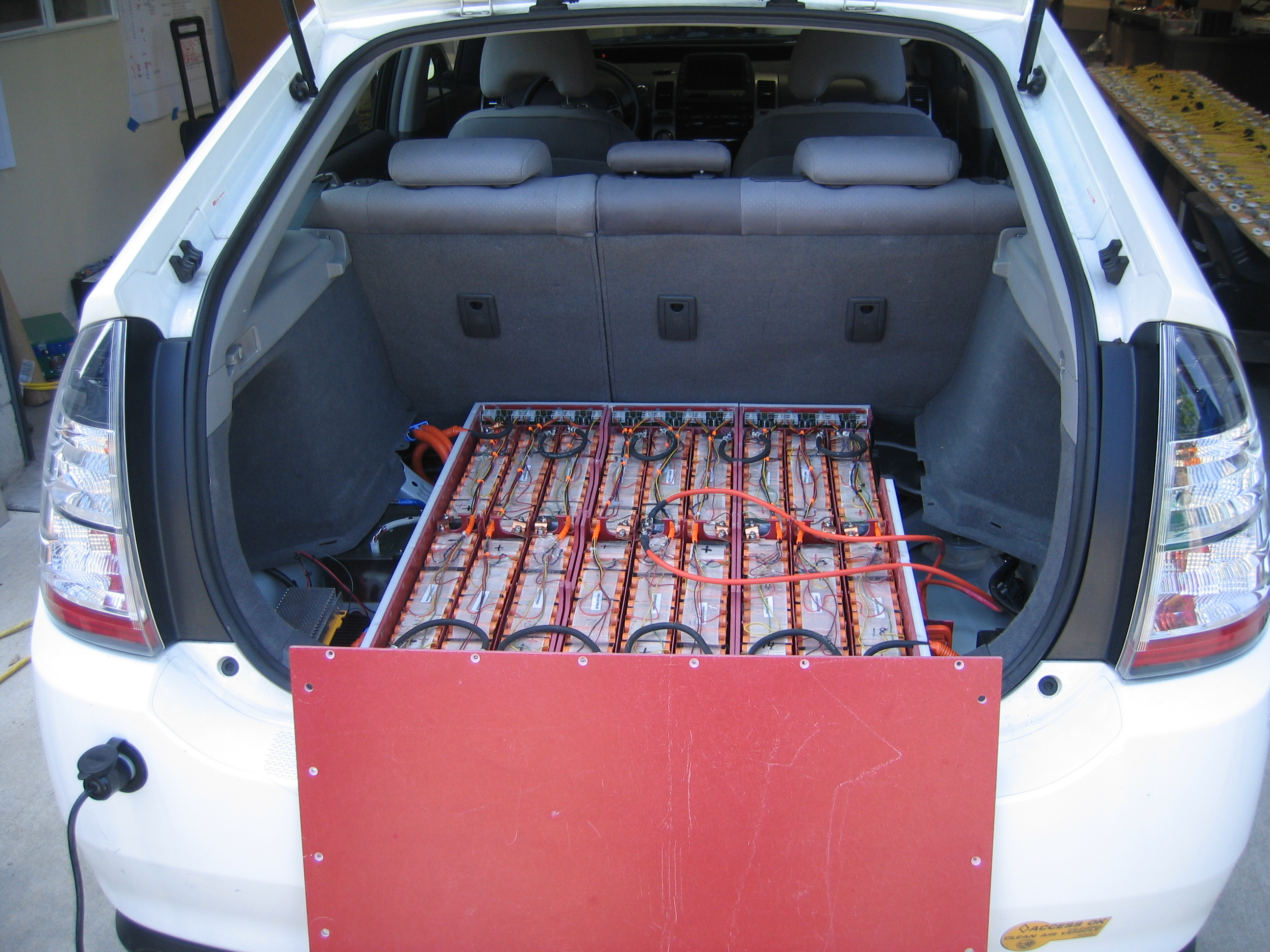
Lithium-ion battery pack, with cover removed, in CalCars' plug-in hybrid converted Toyota Prius, which was the first PHEV based on the Prius and called PRIUS+.

With co-sponsorship from Hypercar, Felix Kramer organized what became the founding meeting of the California Car Company Initiative on July 29, 2002 in Palo Alto, CA, which evolved into the non-profit California Cars Initiative, and shifted its focus from hydrogen fuel cells to the nearer-term plug-in hybrid. The focus was on a solution using existing technology and 120-volt household power, rather than a new infrastructure. CalCars announced its dual approach of technical demonstration of feasibility and advocacy to reach "influencers" and decision-makers. Having recruited engineer Ron Gremban as Technology Lead and begun an open source Prius Plus conversion program, CalCars completed the first Prius conversion in 2004. In 2006, with a conversion by one of the independent conversion companies, Kramer became the "world's first non-technical consumer owner" of a PHEV. He flew that vehicle to Washington, DC in May 2006 for the first public viewing of a PHEV on Capitol Hill.

CalCars worked with allied organizations to build buyer demand for PHEVs in the United States and promote commercial production of plug-in hybrid vehicles by major automakers. It engaged in public education through its web site calcars.org. It displayed its +100 miles per US gallon (2.4 L/100 km; 120 mpg_{‑imp}) PHEVs at public and private events, showed promotional videos, and makes presentations to different audiences, including political leaders and opinion-makers. CalCars also promoted technology development for PHEVs by building example plug-in hybrid vehicles, and maintaining open-source documentation of technological information about its prototypes. In its technology development, CalCars was closely linked with the work of Professor Andrew A. (Andy) Frank and the Team Fate design group at the University of California, Davis.

After the first handful of Prius+ conversions, the PHEVs were displayed at multiple locations and events around the country, including the US Congress. Interest in the PHEV concept swelled, and building conversion kits for DIYers or commercial conversions took off as many small and large companies entered the space. Calcars worked closely with journalists and the media to further stoke interest. Dozens of books on the topic were released and reviewed by Calcars. CalCars tracked and commented on continuing developments through its listserv from 2005 to 2013.

The CC automakers page covered the numerous developments announced by automakers, and CalCars' analysis of them. It further promoted PHEVs with leaders everywhere by featuring photos of them with their vehicles on its "Influencers", and "leaders". CalCars worked to connect PHEV owners to automakers, and welcomed GM's announcement of the Volt. An attempt was made to get companies to offer aftermarket conversions for most existing vehicles on the road, but little success was had in getting aftermarket converters to form a trade group to secure government incentives for conversions. So after several years the conversion market shrank, and currently has one provider, Plug-in Supply.

In November 2009, Calcars declared a preliminary victory, with mass-produced PHEVs and fully electric vehicles set to arrive shortly. Drivers and advocates were migrated to the Electric Auto Association (EEA), Plug In America (PIA), or the Sierra Club for further promotion of CalCars goal of rapidly electrifying all vehicles.

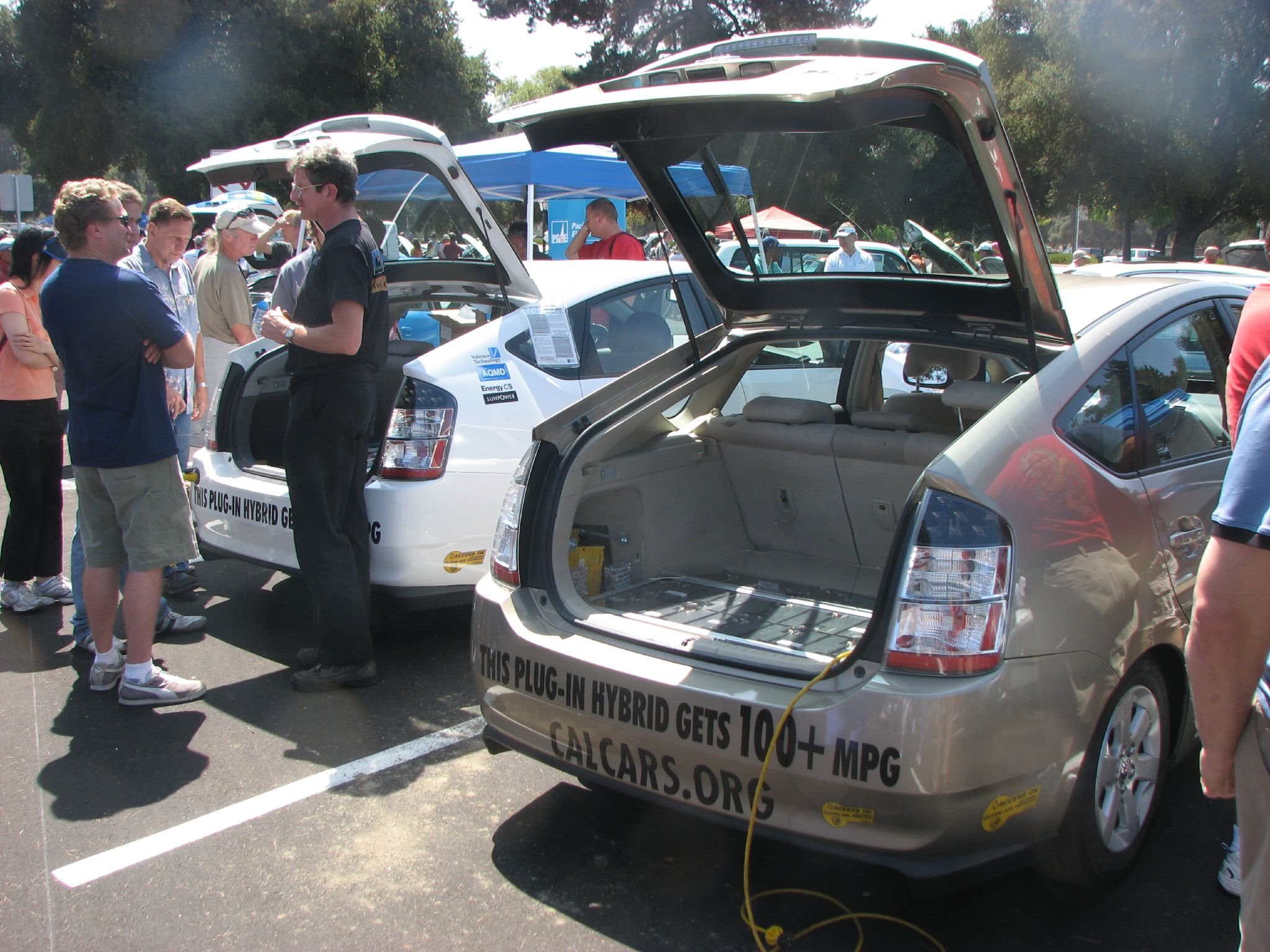
Several plug-in hybrid converted Toyota Prius at Professorville, Palo Alto.

CalCars built the first PRIUS+ conversion, creating the first PHEV based on the 2004 Toyota Prius. This initial conversion was done with a lead-acid battery pack to prove the concept would work. The build team included Ron Gremban, Felix Kramer, Marc Geller, Kevin Lyons, Andrew Lawton. Others who helped included Tom Driscoll, Michael Geller, Richard Jesch, Les Montavon, Dan Putman, Michael Schwabe, Len Tramiel, Bob Westman, Doug Widney.

== Conversions ==
Prius+ (also written Prius Plus) became the open-source standard on which most plug-in hybrid kits were based. Plug-in hybrid kit manufacturers included: A123 Hymotion, Amberjac Systems, based on EDrive Systems emerged from the original EnergyCS, EETrex, Enginer, Hybrid Electric Vehicle Technologies, Plug-In Conversions Corp, Plug-In Supply (still operating), MD-Tech

Beginning in 2008, CalCars started to address the problem that the rate of market penetration (as a percentage of new vehicles into the national and international fleet) would be remarkably slow, even with optimistic assumptions. To accelerate the electrification of transportation and all of its consequent benefits, CalCars started an unsuccessful initiative: spurring the growth of a new industry that converts existing internal combustion engine vehicles into plug-ins.

== Combustion vehicle mass conversions ==
CalCars stated that compared to crushing old vehicles, converting millions of gas-guzzling, internal combustion engine vehicles (pickup trucks, SUVs, and full-size vans -PSVs-) would be a winning energy-saving strategy.

== Key CalCars personnel ==
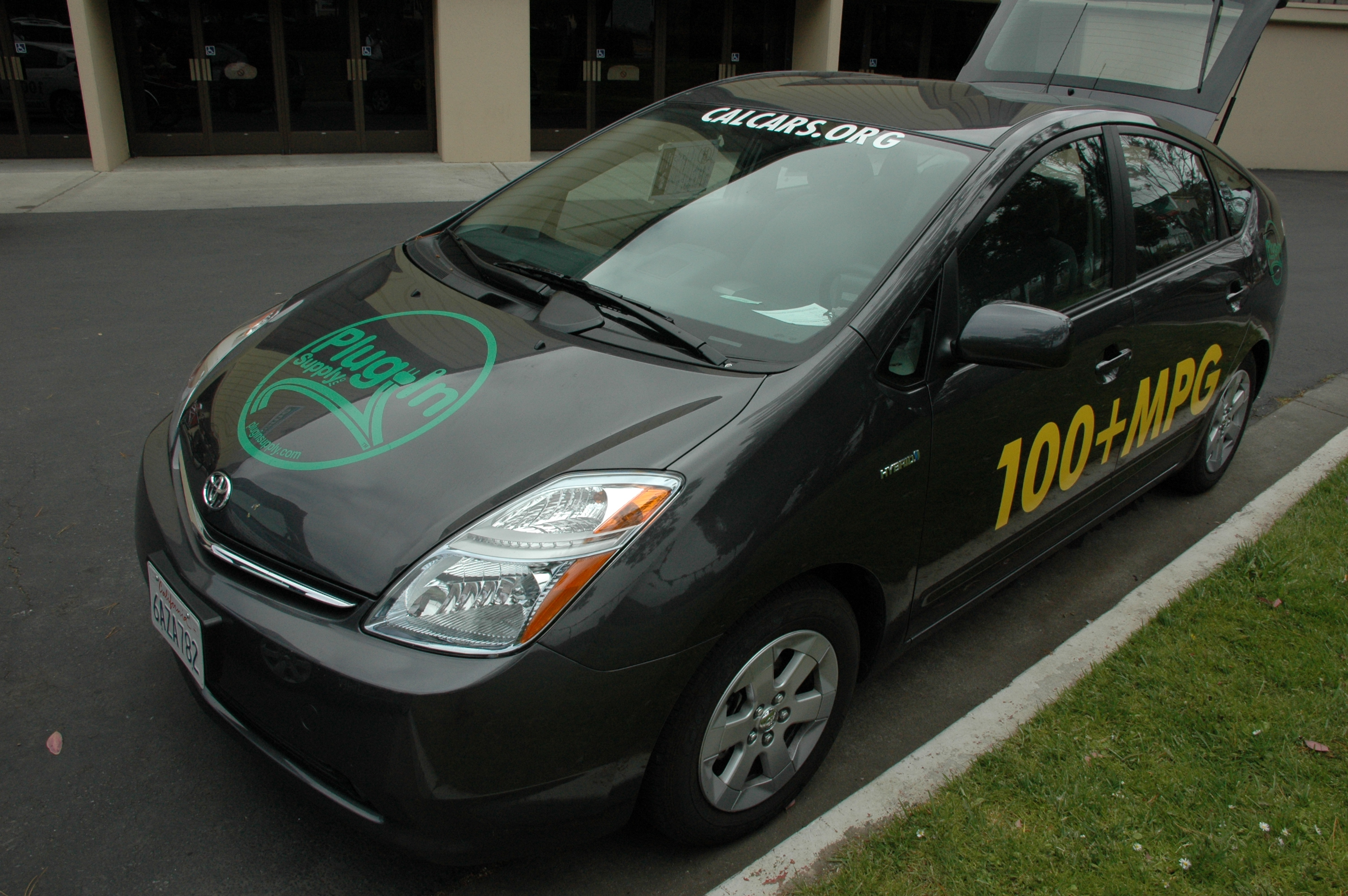
Toyota Prius plug-in hybrid converted by CalCars exhibited at the Maker Fair 2008, San Mateo, California.

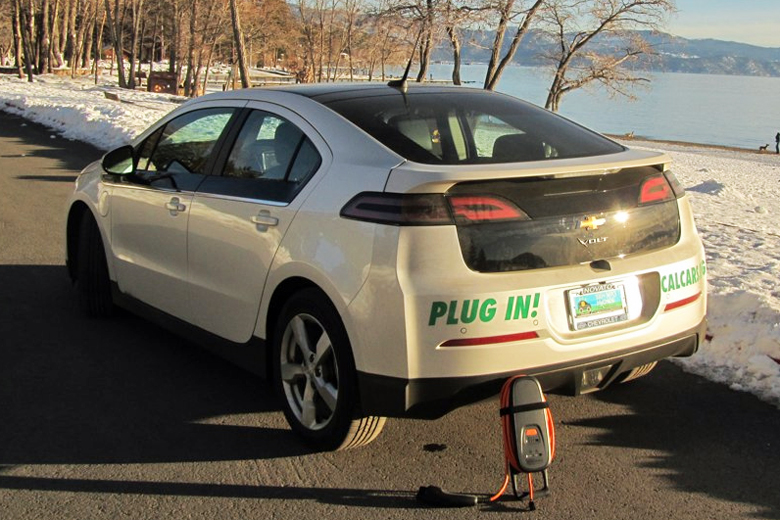
Calcars has supported the new wave of mass production plug-in electric vehicles, including the Chevrolet Volt (shown), the Nissan Leaf, and other PEVs.

Felix Kramer, founder, is a marketing strategist and communicator with an entrepreneurial track record with startups; in the environmental realm, he managed major events and run campaigns and organizations. After founding, running and selling a small Internet company, he volunteered his time to CalCars from 2001 to 2009. Since 2009 he has written articles and worked on projects involving climate change and clean energy, based at his website, BeyondCassandra.org

Ron Gremban, Technology Development Lead for PRIUS+, moderator of the PRIUS+ Plug-In Hybrid Conversion Group, and electrical and software engineer involved in sales of solar energy systems, has long experience with electric cars—he helped design and drive the Caltech entry in the transcontinental 1968 Great Electric Car Race. He has been the lead EE since 2012 at Brillouin Energy in Berkeley, seeking a commercially useful form of LENR (Low Energy Nuclear Reactions).

Gail Slocum, Senior Advisor, former Mayor, Menlo Park and Regulatory Attorney at Pacific Gas and Electric Company.

== See also ==
- Plug-in electric vehicles in California
