= Leah Kramer =

Leah Kramer is an American author, store owner and website founder.

She is the author of The Craftster Guide to Nifty, Thrifty, and Kitschy Crafts: Fifty Fabulous Projects from the Fifties and Sixties and the founder of Craftster, an online community for crafting and DIY enthusiasts.

Kramer is the co-founder and co-owner of Magpie, a brick and mortar store in Somerville, Massachusetts, which sells handmade goods and local art by crafters and artists.

== Publications ==
- Kramer, Leah (2006). The Craftster Guide to Nifty, Thrifty, and Kitschy Crafts: Fifty Fabulous Projects from the Fifties and Sixties. Ten Speed Press. ISBN 1-58008-747-7.
