= Orin Kramer =

American financier

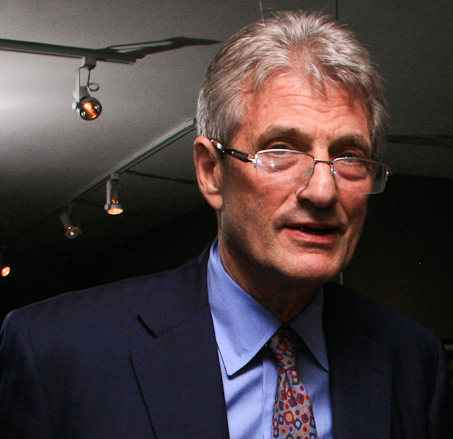
- Born: Orin Stuart Kramer; June 27, 1945 (age 80); Maplewood, New Jersey, U.S.
- Education: Yale University (BA); Columbia University (JD)
- Political party: Democratic
- Spouse: Hilary Ballon

Orin Stuart Kramer is an American hedge fund manager and founder of Boston Provident LP.

== Education ==
Born to a Jewish family, Kramer graduated from Deerfield Academy Class of 1963 and earned a B.A. from Yale College (where he roomed with former New York state governor George Pataki) and a J.D. from Columbia Law School.

== Career ==
From 1981 to 1983, Kramer was a member of the financial institutions group at the management consulting firm of McKinsey & Co. From 1977 to 1981, he served as Associate Director of the White House Domestic Policy Staff. Previously, Kramer had been an associate with the law firm of Simpson Thacher & Bartlett and executive director of the New York State Commission on Living Costs and the Economy.

In 1986, he served as vice-chairman and executive director of a special commission appointed by Governor Cuomo to study the liability insurance crisis and civil justice reform, and he co-authored the New York DeWind Commission report on product deregulation for banks. Kramer has published two books and a number of studies on the financial services industry. He has taught financial institutions law at Columbia Law School.

In 1990, Kramer was appointed by the Governor of California as executive director of the California Commission on Ratemaking for Workers Compensation Insurance. In 1992, he served as a coordinator of President-elect Clinton's transition team on financial services issues. In 1995, he was designated by the Secretary of Treasury to serve as a member of the Advisory Commission on Financial Services.

He was named by U.S. President Bill Clinton as a member of the commission to Study Capital Budgeting. In 2007, he was appointed by the Pennsylvania State Treasurer as a member of the Financial Asset Management Commission.

In 2009, he received the Outstanding Contribution Award at the 8th annual Hedge Fund Industry Awards.

Kramer is general partner of Boston Provident, L.P., and has served on the boards of several financial services firms, public and private. He was Chairman of the New Jersey State Investment Council and the Robert F. Kennedy Center for Justice and Human Rights. He is a board member of the National Parks Foundation and the Alliance for Climate Protection.

== Political contributions and philanthropy ==
Kramer was a key fundraiser for president Barack Obama.

== Personal life ==
Kramer was married to Hilary Ballon, the daughter of Charles Ballon, a prominent Manhattan lawyer who orchestrated the merger between the United Jewish Appeal and the Federation of Jewish Philanthropies. Hilary Ballon was an architectural historian who spent much of her career at Columbia University and specialized in the history of urban planning and architecture. She died on June 16, 2017, at the age of 61.
