= Kraemer House =

Kraemer House may refer to:

- Kraemer House (Prairieville, Louisiana), listed on the NRHP in Louisiana
- Samuel Kraemer Building, in Anaheim, California, listed on the NRHP in Orange County, California
- Kraemer-Harman House, Hot Springs, Arkansas, listed on the NRHP in Arkansas
