= Kramer graph =

A Kramer graph is a specific multiple-line 2D geometric symbolic representation of the characteristics of intake, scavenging and exhaust components in a two-stroke cycle engine.

They are typically used to visualize the opening time versus area and/ or lift of the following components:

- Intake port / valve
- Scavenging port / valve
- Exhaust port / valve
- Reed inlet valve
- Rotary inlet valve

== Description ==
These representations are used to describe corresponding changes in crankshaft angle and port-area.

A Kramer graph plots the relation of the open area of various ports with respect to the angle of the crankshaft in a two-stroke engine. So that upon completion of the cycle (one revolution of 360°) there has been no net change in state of the system; i.e. the device returns to the starting position and area which is zero.

They do not show the specific configuration of ports like in a port-map, which enables it to illustrate a more useful visualization of port area distribution,

This could be useful because different types of port configurations could have the same opening time and area.

== Application ==
In these graphs the X-axis represents the crankshaft angle (θ) in degrees, and the Y-axis represents the open area in any square unit of measurement such as mm². To discern the different types of ports each type is given a designated color.

For example, (commonly used):

- Blue - Intake system
- Green - Scavenging system
- Red - Exhaust system
- Purple - Inlet valve

Many engineers and engine tuners prefer to use the version of a polar graph of this concept to compare different engines to one another. These are commonly called "Kramer cams", referring to a four-stroke camshaft.

== Origin ==
Kramer graphs are named after Dutch engineer Hans Kramer, who is considered to have been the first to use this type of graph in a publication on the effect of port shape and area on two-stroke cycle engine performance.
