= Rudolf Kramer (poultry expert) =

German poultry expert (1844–1904)

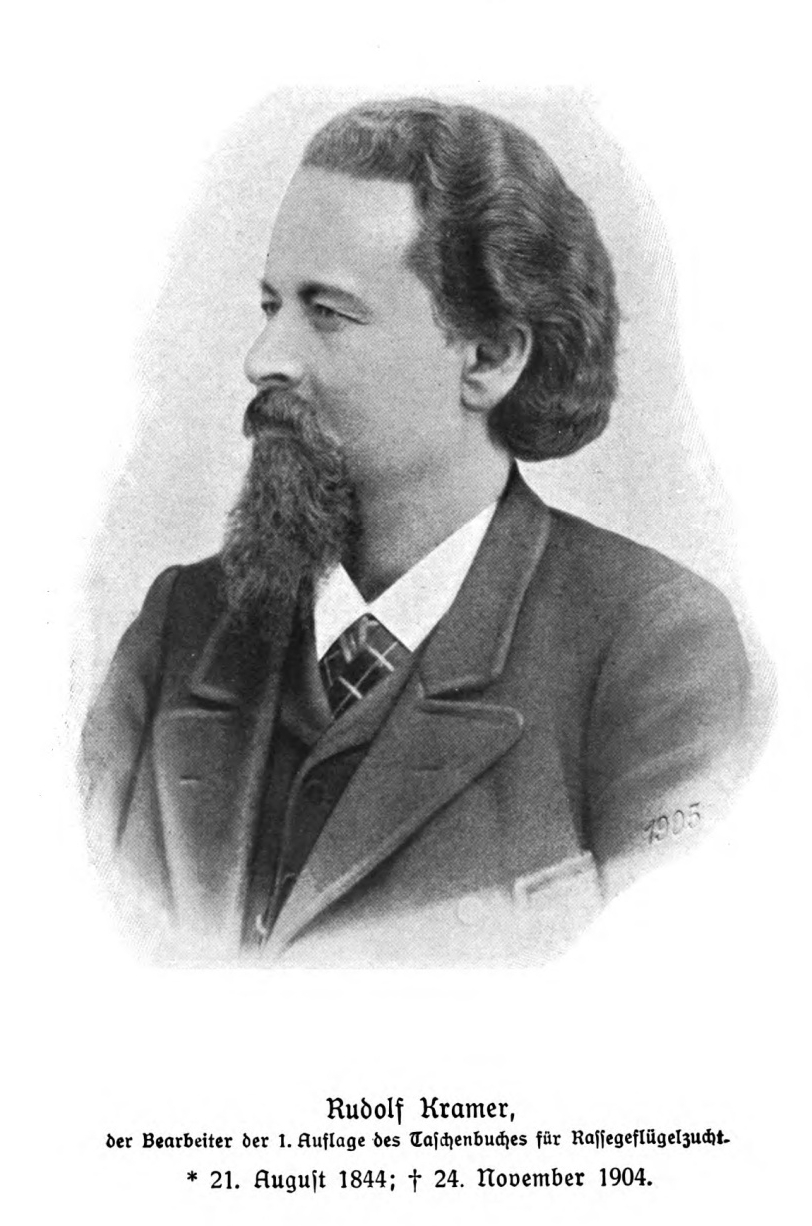
Portrait

Rudolf Kramer (21 August 1844 – 24 August 1904) was a German poultry expert who published an illustrated pocket guide to poultry breeds that was a popular standard for a period from its first publication in 1899 to the early 20th century. The guide itself went into several editions after his death and was referred to merely as Der Kramer.

Little is known of Kramer's early life. Kramer was a German writer who became an editor for the German poultry magazine Allgemeine Deutsche Geflügel Zeitung. He was active in poultry breeding associations and served as president of the Leipzig poultry breeding association from 1884 to 1893. In 1899 he published a pocketbook of illustrated poultry breeds which included 107 chromolithographs and description of the breeds. The first edition had a foreword by Hugo du Roi (1839-1911). It was revised and reprinted in 1908, again in 1926. It also had an influence on other books. Kramer died in Leipzig in 1904 and a poultry prize in his memory was established in 1905.
