= I. Raymond Kremer =

American judge

Judge I. Raymond Kremer
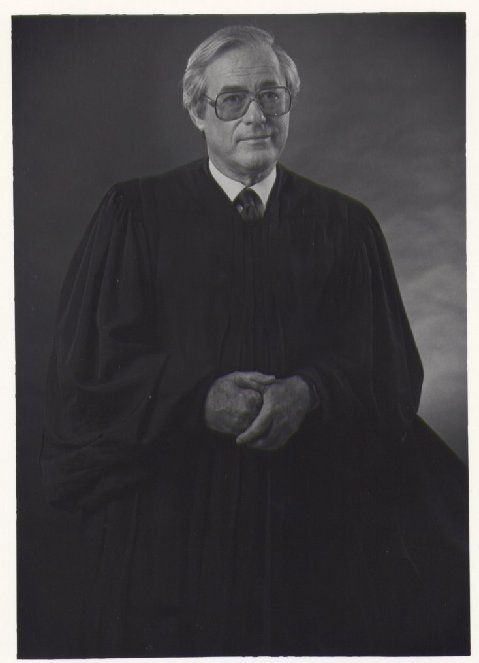
- Born: January 28, 1921; Philadelphia, Pennsylvania
- Died: March 26, 1999 (aged 78); Philadelphia, Pennsylvania

I. Raymond Kremer (January 28, 1921 – March 26, 1999) was an American attorney and judge, whose career spanned more than 50 years, including 19 years as a judge of the Philadelphia Court of Common Pleas.

== Background ==
'Kremer was born January 28, 1921, in Philadelphia. He graduated from Temple University in 1942, and Temple University School of Law in 1948. He attended Indiana University for additional studies on Constitutional law. He served in the United States Army from 1943–1946 and was discharged as a First Lieutenant, JAG.

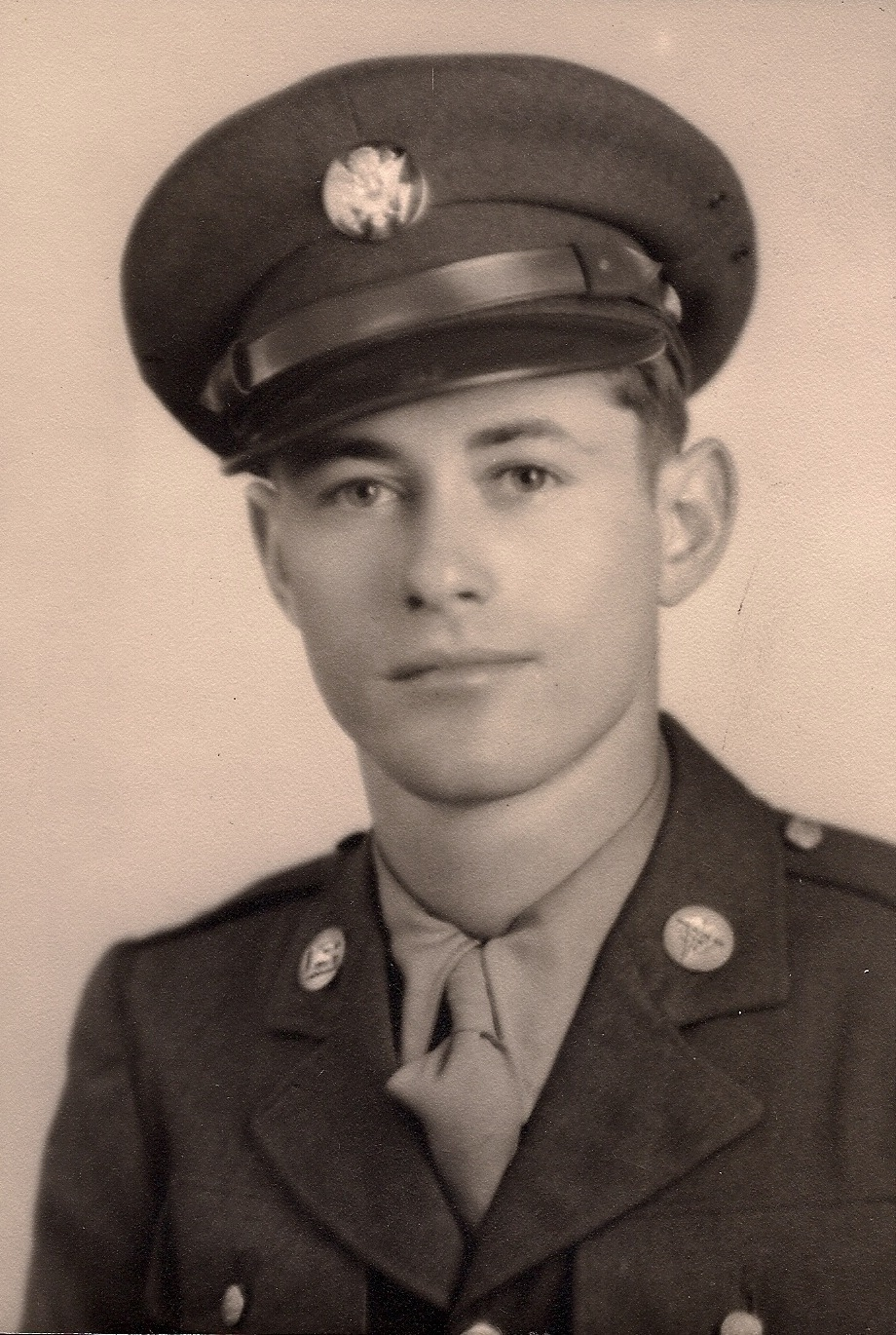

== Career ==
Judge Kremer was appointed as the first Chair of the Judicial Ethics Committee of the State Conference of Trial Judges and served in that capacity with distinction. He was a voracious advocate of judicial independence and could be counted upon to uphold the individual rights of judges. On December 8, 1976, he was appointed to the Court of Common Pleas of Philadelphia and elected November 1977. William L. Keller, Esq., past President of the Philadelphia Trial Lawyers Association, stated in the Musmanno award program in 1980, "Judge Kremer is noted for his intelligence, imagination, courage, resourcefulness and total dedication to the highest ideals of the legal profession. In honoring Judge Kremer, we bring honor on [ourselves]."

== Special positions and awards ==
As an attorney he served on the Board of Governors of the Philadelphia Bar Association and the Philadelphia Trial Lawyers Association. He was a member of TER Law Society, 21 Jewel Square Club, N'nai B'rith Justice Lodge, Variety Club, Fellowship Commission, and the Executive Committee of the Temple University Law Alumni. In 1972 he was awarded the B'nai B'rith Award of Distinction for "devotion to justice in the broadest sense." In 1978 Tau Epsilon Rho Law Fraternity awarded the appreciation award for "dedicated service on behalf of all lawyers and the independence of the judiciary." He was the recipient of the second annual Musmanno Award by the Philadelphia Trial Lawyers Association, and in 1980 was the honoree of the Pediatric Colitis Foundation. In 1985 he received the Judiciary Award for exemplary service by the 21 Jewel Square Club.
