= Kramar =

Kramar is a surname. Notable people with the surname include:

- Anton Kramar (born 1988), Ukrainian footballer
- Denis Kramar (born 1991), Slovenian footballer
- Frantisek Kramar (1759–1831), Czech composer
- Karel Kramář (1860–1937), Czech politician
- Urban Kramar (born 1990), Slovenian footballer
- Vladimir Kramar (born 1993), Russian ice hockey goaltender

== See also ==
- Kramář's Villa, is the official residence of the Prime Minister of the Czech Republic
