= Michael Krämer =

German footballer

Personal information
- Date of birth: 9 December 1985 (age 40)
- Place of birth: Nuremberg, West Germany
- Position: Defender

Team information
- Current team: 1. FC Schweinfurt 05
- Number: 10

Youth career
- SG 83 Nürnberg
- Post-SV Nürnberg
- SpVgg Greuther Fürth

Senior career*
Years	Team	Apps	(Gls)
2004–2005	SpVgg Greuther Fürth II		
2005–2006	SpVgg Greuther Fürth	2	(0)
2006–2007	SpVgg Greuther Fürth II	44	(3)
2007–2009	1. FC Nuremberg II	35	(1)
2009–2010	1. FC Eintracht Bamberg	29	(1)
2010–2012	FSV Erlangen-Bruck	38	(3)
2012–	1. FC Schweinfurt 05	78	(3)
- * Club domestic league appearances and goals as of 3 July 2015

Michael Krämer (born 9 December 1985) is a German footballer. He made his debut on the professional league level in the 2. Bundesliga for SpVgg Greuther Fürth on 29 April 2005, when he came on as a substitute in the 54th minute in a game against Rot-Weiß Oberhausen.
