= Fritz Kraemer =

Fritz Kraemer may refer to:

- Fritz G. A. Kraemer (1908–2003), German-American military educator and advisor
- Fritz Kraemer (Waffen-SS) (1900–1959), Waffen-SS member during World War II
