= Paul Kremer =

American painter (born 1971)

- Born: January 2, 1971; Chicago, Illinois, U.S.
- Known for: Painting
- Movement: Color Field painting, Conceptual Art, Post-painterly abstraction

Paul Kremer (born January 2, 1971) is an American artist whose artwork references Color Field painting and Minimalism.

== Work ==
=== Paintings ===
Art in America's Raphael Rubinstein describes Kremer's work as "bold compositions whose hard-edge, single-color shapes (generally red-orange, black, or white) oscillate between flat abstraction and illusionistic geometry, evoking monumental architecture as well as broken-off glacier sections. " Rubinstein also writes: "Kremer's uninflected surfaces and smooth contours mark him as an heir of Ellsworth Kelly."

New York-based art historian and curator Alex Bacon has written extensively on Kremer's work and has praised the artist's ability to combine abstraction with everyday familiarity: "Abstracting from familiar forms. . . enables Kremer to harness the sensations that arise from our day-to-day encounters." Kremer's work has also been referred to as "wonderfully freeing" and Kremer's use of overlapping color fields has been likened to "Josef Albers-style color interactions."

=== Great Art in Ugly Rooms ===
In 2013 Kremer began a Tumblr site called Great Art in Ugly Rooms, which has been described as "the visual equivalent of a Steven Wright stand up routine" and as the "enchanting train wreck that occurs when a truly great work of art is juxtaposed with the most revolting of interiors." The site quickly gained a loyal cult following worldwide and began to garner critical attention from a number of online media sites. Kremer's public showings of these images were well received by local Houston media.

=== Image Search Paintings ===
Kremer captures screenshots of image searches and presents them as large-scale ink jet prints. These works were on view at Mark Flood Resents (collection) in Miami during Art Basel 2014.

=== Art Scrub ===
Kremer's idea of the "art scrub" is an offshoot concept of the Photoshop-driven visual manipulations associated with GAIUR. The term "art scrub" refers to the virtual photo-manipulative act of electronically erasing artwork from its gallery surroundings.

=== I Love You Baby ===
Kremer was a co-founder of ILYB and a regular collaborator with this "legendary Houston anti-art collective" (1997–2007). Other founder members included Rodney Elliott and Will Bentsen. In 2002 the group began meeting regularly on Wednesday nights at Commerce Street Artists’ Warehouse (CSAW) and adopted the name I Love You Baby (ILYB). They soon inducted Chris Bexar and Dale Stewart as ILYB members. Regular contributors Mark Flood, Andrea Chin, Ed Goleman, Julie Boone, and Hugo Fat were documented visiting weekly. Other notable artists such as Mel Chin and Daniel Johnston visited on occasion. ILYB's website iloveyoubaby.org acts as an archive of their work from 2003 to 2008.

In 2005 ILYB achieved local notoriety for their mock installation-driven send up of corporate culture in the "Office Christmas Party Show" at Commerce Street Artists Warehouse. In 2006, ILYB was voted "Best Artistic Collaboration" by the Houston Press.

== See also ==
- Color field painting
- Hard-edge painting
- Post-painterly abstraction
- Dada
- Conceptual Art
