= Elmer Kraemer =

American chemist

Elmer O. Kraemer
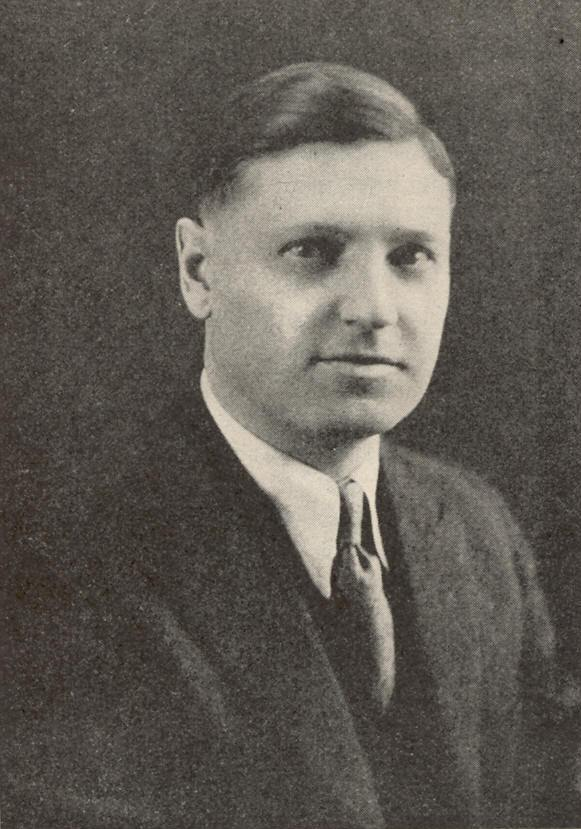
- Born: February 27, 1898; Liberty, Wisconsin, U.S.
- Died: September 7, 1943 (aged 45); Pittsburgh, Pennsylvania, U.S.
- Education: University of Wisconsin
- Known for: Polymer chemistry Colloid chemistry nylon
- Awards: Named in top 250 out of 28,000 scientists listed in 1938 American Men of Science
- Scientific career
- Fields: Chemistry
- Workplaces: University of Uppsala, Sweden; Kaiser Wilhelm Institute, Berlin, Germany; University of Wisconsin; E. I. duPont de Nemours Co. University of Delaware
- Doctoral advisor: The Svedberg; Herbert Freundlich; Louis Kahlenberg

Elmer Otto Kraemer (February 27, 1898 – September 7, 1943) was an American chemist whose studies and published results materially aided in the transformation of colloid chemistry from a qualitative to a quantitative science. For eleven years, from 1927 to 1938, he was the leader of research chemists studying fundamental and industrial colloid chemistry problems and a peer of Wallace Hume Carothers at the Experimental Station of the E. I. du Pont de Nemours Company where both men contributed to the invention of nylon that was publicly announced on October 27, 1938. The 1953 Nobel Laureate in chemistry, Hermann Staudinger, had a high regard for the American pioneers in polymer chemistry, particularly Kraemer and Carothers

== Early work ==
Elmer Kraemer was born in Liberty, Wisconsin on February 27, 1898. In 1918, he received his B.S. degree from the University of Wisconsin. He remained there as instructor working with Prof. Louis Kahlenberg toward a Ph.D. degree. In 1921 he was awarded an American Scandinavian Fellowship and he spent a year in Sweden doing research on colloid chemistry with Prof. The Svedberg, the 1926 Nobel laureate in Chemistry. He continued his colloid chemistry research with Herbert Freundlich at the Kaiser Wilhelm Institute for Physical Chemistry and Electrochemistry in Berlin, Germany before returning to Wisconsin. For most of 1923 he worked on the kino-ultramicroscope and during part of the year assisted Prof. The Svedberg when Svedberg served as a guest lecturer at the University of Wisconsin. A year later, in 1924, Kraemer was granted his Ph.D. degree at the University of Wisconsin.

== Later Work ==
The Svedberg discovered with Robin Fahraeus in 1924 that hemoglobin had a sharply defined molecular weight of 66,800 (four times the previous estimate of 16,700). Svedberg went on to investigate the molecular weights of other proteins. Meanwhile, Elmer Kraemer (1898–1943) and William D. Lansing (1902–1937) at Du Pont later used the ultracentrifuge to determine the molecular weight of a synthetic polymer in 1933.

In 1935, the first prototype chemical is produced that would become DuPont's nylon. The company focuses on ramping up production of nylon over the next few years before announcing the invention of nylon stockings at the New York World's Fair in Oct. 1938. However, most nylon production was diverted to war time production and nylon stockings did not become available in large quantities until after World War II.

In a formal process sponsored by the Carnegie Institution of Washington, D.C., colleagues of Dr. Elmer Otto Kraemer selected him as one of the leading 250 scientists out of the 28,000 listed in the 1938 "American Men of Science." The formal process for selecting the top 250 leading scientists in American (indicated by a *6 in the listing) was first funded in 1906 by the Carnegie Institution of Washington, D.C. probably to aid in the philanthropy of Andrew Carnegie. New editions were released every five or so years except for delays caused by World War I and World War II.

The 1938 "American Men of Science" listing for Elmer Kraemer said he lived on U.S. Postal Rural Route 2 in Marshallton, Delaware, which was nearby the DuPont research facility. Kraemer's scientific specialty was listed as being "Physical Chemistry." The book listed Kraemer as the "colloid group leader" at the Experimental Research Station of E.I. du Pont de Nemours and Co. from 1927 to 1938 when he left to work in Uppsala, Sweden and Berlin, Germany for a few years before returning to the U.S. to serve the Franklin Institute. Kraemer's areas of scientific research were listed in the book as being "colloids; formation and structure of gels; colloid behavior of proteins; emulsification; cellulose and cellulose derivatives and other high polymers; the ultra centrifuge."

== Premature death ==
Elmer Kraemer's scientific career was prematurely cut short by his unexpected and quick death from a cerebral hemorrhage, on September 7, 1943, at St. Joseph's Hospital in Pittsburgh, Pennsylvania, while he was attending a luncheon at the 106th meeting of the American Chemical Society. A short newspaper article called Dr. Kraemer an "internationally known colloidal chemist" who "was internationally recognized as an outstanding investigator in the field of colloid chemistry." Kraemer was survived by his wife Huldah Florence Kraemer and his two sons Herbert and Paul Kraemer.

== See also ==
- Nylon
