= Charles Kramer (producer) =

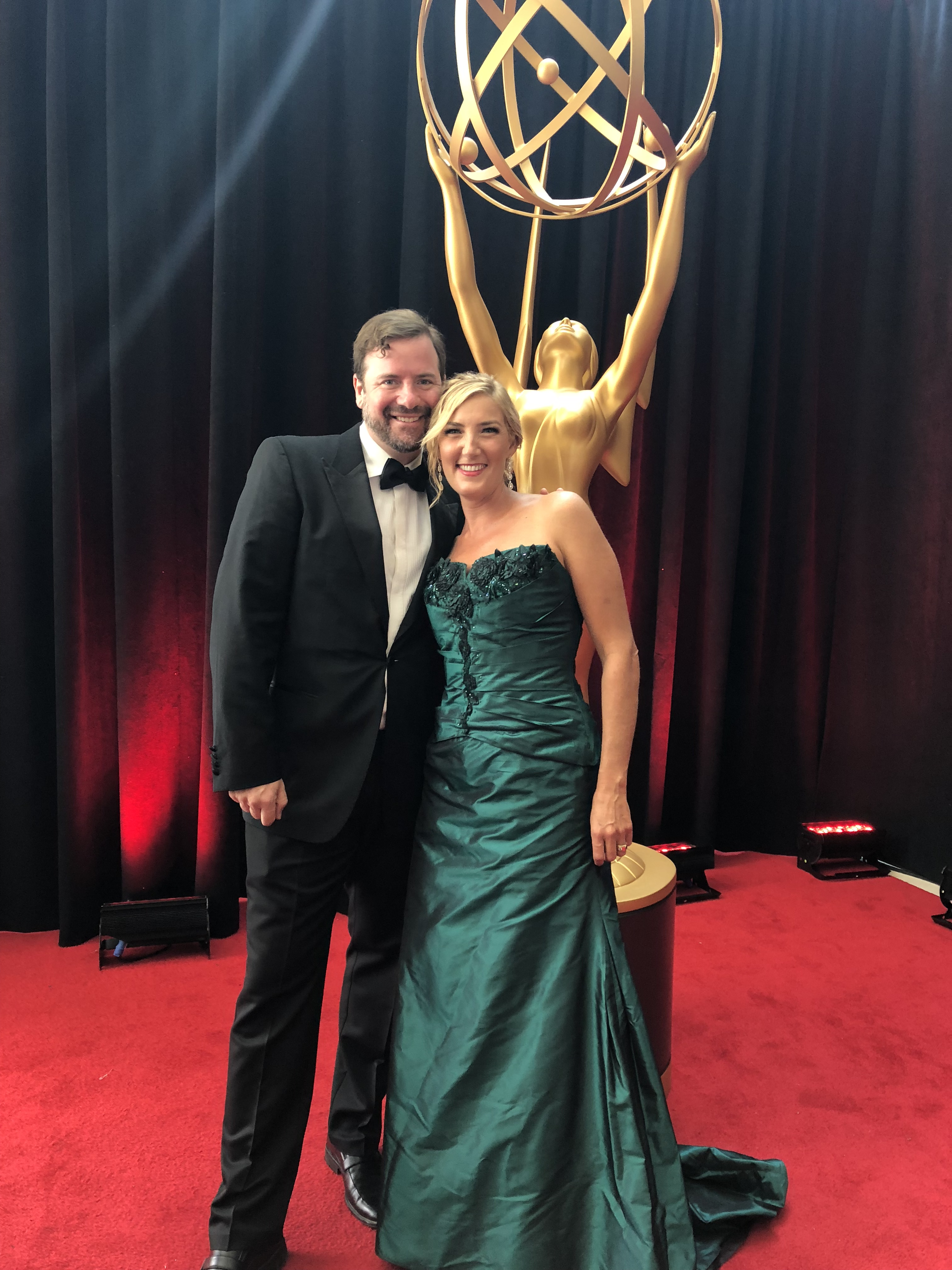

Charles Kramer is an American television co-executive producer and editor.

He has worked on shows such as Amazon/Mr. Beast's Beast Games; NBC's The Voice; HBO's Project Greenlight; Discovery's Street Outlaws; BET's Real Husbands of Hollywood; MTV's The Osbournes, Newlyweds: Nick and Jessica, Rich Girls, The Ashlee Simpson Show, and Duets; NBC's The Sing-Off and Escape Routes, TNT's The Great Escape; ABC's Dancing with the Stars; Bravo's Top Chef and Kathy Griffin: My Life on the D-List; and CBS's Big Brother.

A University of Miami alumnus, Kramer created Film Art Revolution, which became a local film festival showcasing student films with live, improvised soundtracks. He began his career working with renowned trailer editor Thomas Swords. Together they worked on Swingers, Lost Highway, Freebird: The Movie, and Kolya.

In 2013, Kramer was elected to the Motion Picture Editors Guild's board of directors.
