= Emmanuel College (Massachusetts) =

Private college in Boston, Massachusetts, US

- Motto: "God with us"
- Type: Private college
- Established: 1919; 107 years ago
- Accreditation: NECHE
- Affiliations: Roman Catholic (Sisters of Notre Dame de Namur)
- Academic affiliations: Colleges of the Fenway; Annapolis Group
- Endowment: $176.1 million (2025)
- President: E. Elizabeth "Beth" Ross
- Faculty: 208
- Administrative staff: 276
- Students: 1,954 (fall 2025)
- Undergraduates: 1,847 (fall 2025)
- Postgraduates: 107 (fall 2025)
- Location: Boston, Massachusetts, U.S. 42°20′30″N 71°6′12″W
- Campus: 17 acres (6.9 ha); Urban
- Fight Song: When the Saints Go Marching In
- Colors
- Nickname: Saints
- Sporting affiliations: NCAA Division III - GNAC; NEISA
- Mascot: Halo the Saint Bernard
- Website: emmanuel.edu/
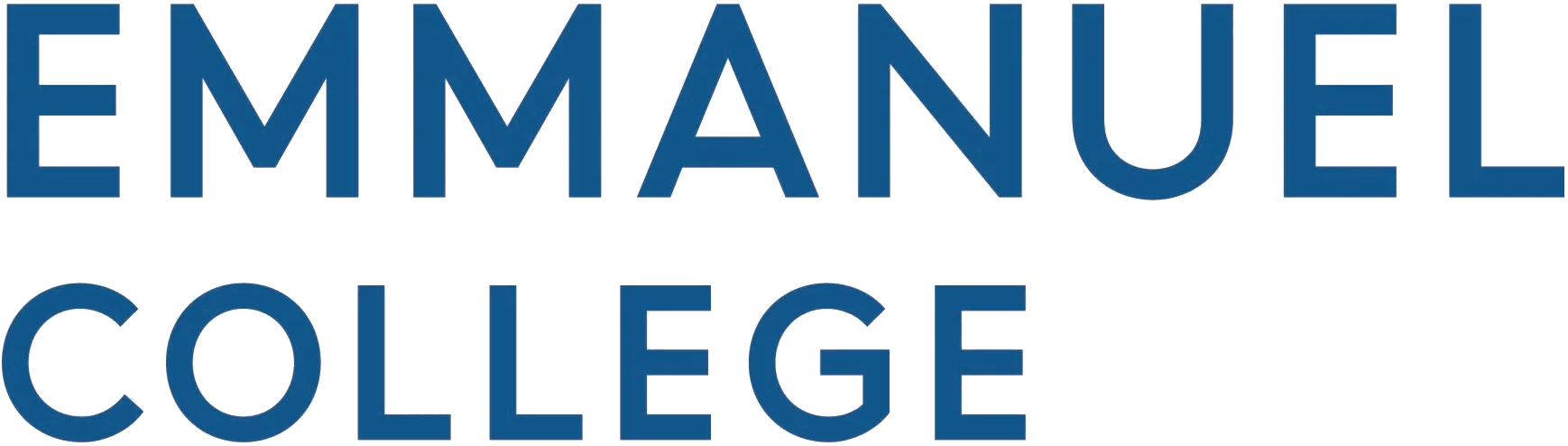

Emmanuel College is a private Catholic college in Boston, Massachusetts, United States. The college was founded by the Sisters of Notre Dame de Namur as a women's college in 1919. In 2001, the college officially became a coeducational institution. It is a member of the Colleges of the Fenway consortium. In addition to the Fenway campus, Emmanuel operates a living and learning campus in Roxbury, Massachusetts.

== History ==
In the early years, Emmanuel was a day college preparing women for professional fields such as education, nursing, and social work. Despite being commuters, students were involved in numerous co-curricular activities including student publications and athletics. The 1920s, 1930s, and 1940s saw growth not only in the student population, academic programs and activities, but also in the physical campus, with additional land purchases on Brookline Avenue and Avenue Louis Pasteur. In 1949, the college completed the construction of Alumnae Hall, a science center, the first building constructed on campus after the original Administration Building.

The trustees of the college were incorporated by the state in 1921.

John F. Kennedy served on the college's advisory board from 1946 until his death in 1963.

Longtime President Janet Eisner, who had presided over years of enrollment decline and sought to save the college from closure, oversaw a signed agreement with Merck Pharmaceuticals. With this, the college agreed to lease a portion of its campus for a new research laboratory to Merck for 75 years and approximately $50 million. The agreement made Emmanuel the only college in the country with a pharmaceutical lab on campus.

At the same time, Emmanuel started admitting men, enrolling its first undergraduate male students in 2001. The financially stabilizing alliance with Merck permitted Emmanuel to begin building new dorms and buying back buildings it had sold in leaner times. Going co-ed and improving the campus sparked a sustained revival that made Emmanuel one of the fastest-growing colleges in New England at that time. Emmanuel's building plan also included the Jean Yawkey Student Center, which opened in 2004 as the first new building on campus in 35 years.

The college administration used the windfall to secure millions in federal science grants to fund the construction of a $50 million science center. The Maureen Murphy Wilkens Science Center opened in the fall of 2009, effectively doubling the academic space of the campus. The Wilkens Center is four floors and 47,500 feet and contains faculty/student research space and offices, student study areas, new classrooms for all academic areas, 120 underground parking spaces, as well as teaching laboratories for biology, chemistry, biochemistry, and physics.

In 2016, Julie Hall was torn down to make way for a new apartment-style 18-floor residence hall. Built for a cost of $140 million, the cost of the project was the same as Emmanuel's total endowment. The resulting residence hall opened in 2018, provides 692 beds of apartment-style housing to upper-class Emmanuel students and approximately 250 students from nearby Massachusetts College of Pharmacy and Health Sciences, generating additional revenue.

In 2022, president Janet Eisner retired and Mary K. Boyd was named the college's 13th president. She abruptly resigned the following year. In August 2023, Beth Ross was named acting president and the following January she was named the college's 14th president.

== Campus ==
Emmanuel's 17-acre (6.9 ha) campus is located adjacent to the Longwood Medical District in the Fenway area of Boston. The gated campus consists of 11 buildings, including seven academic buildings and four dormitories. Academic buildings include the original Administration Building, the Cardinal Cushing Library, the Jean Yawkey Center, Marian Hall, the Maureen Murphy Wilkens Science Center and Merck Research Laboratories-Boston.

The Emmanuel College Administration Building was built in 1919 by the architecture firm Maginnis & Walsh. Maginnis & Walsh are also known for building Gasson Hall at Boston College and the Basilica of the National Shrine of the Immaculate Conception in Washington, D.C. The Administration Building at Emmanuel College is notable for its early 20th century Gothic architecture.

Approximately 75% of Emmanuel's traditional undergraduates reside in the residence halls on campus, while the remainder commute from the local area. The four older dormitories include St. Ann Hall, Loretto Hall, St. Joseph Hall and St. Julie Hall (formerly New Residence Hall). In 2018, Emmanuel College opened an 18-story residence hall at the location of the original Julie Hall. The new St. Julie Hall provides apartment-style housing to upper-class students, as well as a convenience store and a Dunkin' Donuts.

== Organization ==
The college is Roman Catholic, founded by the Sisters of Notre Dame de Namur. It is also a member of the Colleges of the Fenway consortium, which also includes neighboring Massachusetts College of Art and Design, Massachusetts College of Pharmacy and Health Sciences, Simmons College, Wentworth Institute of Technology, and formerly Wheelock College.

== Academics ==
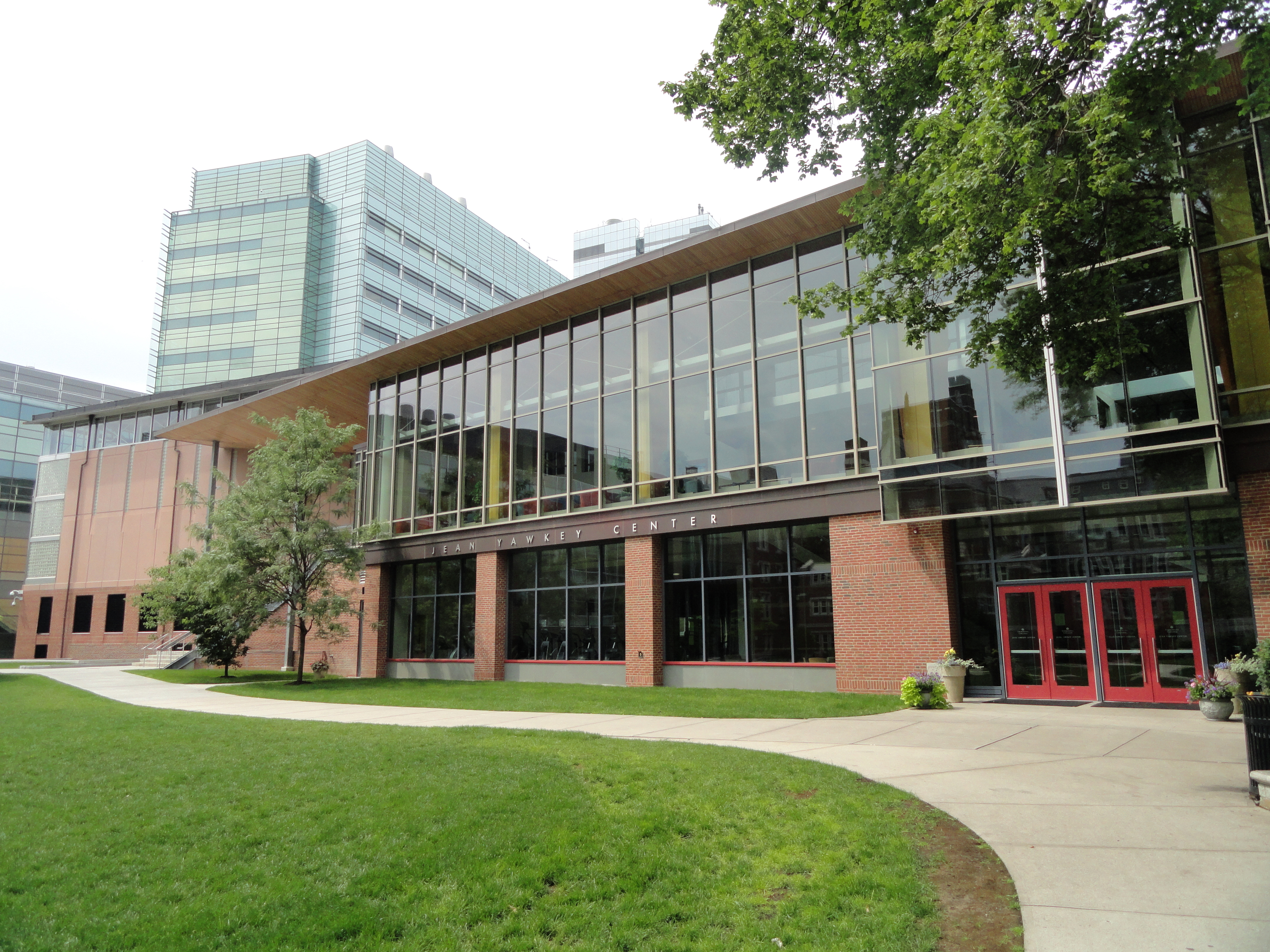
Jean Yawkey Center

At the undergraduate level, Emmanuel offers over 70 majors, minors and concentrations in the liberal arts and sciences.

The Bachelor of Arts, Bachelor of Science, and Bachelor of Fine Arts degrees require the successful completion of a minimum of 128 credits, distributed among the general requirements, major requirements and elective or minor courses. Students are required to complete the first-year seminar program during the first semester of their freshman year, which consists of a one-semester topical seminar related to "Knowledge, Values and Social Change."

Emmanuel College is composed of six schools. These are the School of Humanities & Social Sciences, the School of Science & Health, the School of Business & Management, the School of Education, and the School of Nursing.

In 2019, the Massachusetts Board of Registration in Nursing granted the college initial approval status for four-year Bachelor of Science in Nursing Program.

Emmanuel College is accredited by the New England Commission of Higher Education.

=== Scholars ===
As of Fall 2022, Emmanuel College has produced several Fulbright faculty scholars in the past decade: two in 2015–16 and one in 2020–2021. In addition, Emmanuel produced student Fulbright scholars annually from 2010 to 2014, and again saw two students awarded Fulbright grants in the 2020–2021 academic year.

=== Internships ===
Internships are an integral part of the curriculum. 100% of Emmanuel graduates complete an internship. The Office of Internships and Career Development has over 850 internship opportunities in Greater Boston listed on its career website, EC3: Emmanuel College Career Connect. As of 2010, 1/3 of the job offers that new Emmanuel graduates receive come from the companies at which they interned.

=== Graduate and professional programs ===
Emmanuel began offering graduate and professional programs in management, nursing and education in 1980. Today the college enrolls 700 graduate and professional students in online programs and offers degrees and certificates in business, education, and nursing.

== Student life ==
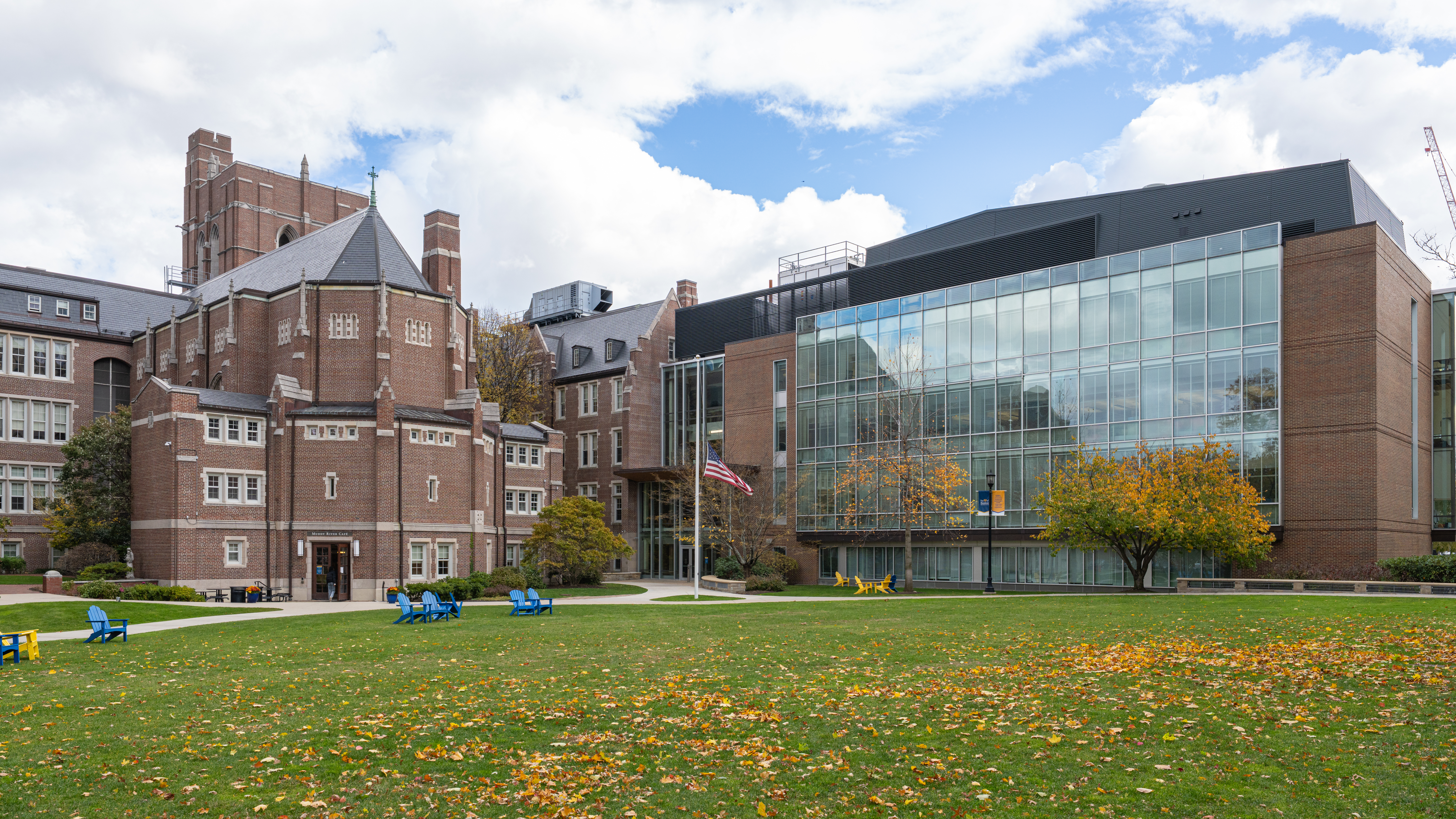
Emmanuel College, Maureen Murphy Wilkens Science Center (2025)

The college sponsors approximately 50 student clubs and organizations, most of which are managed by the Office of Student Activities and Multicultural Programs. Academic clubs include Art, Art Therapy, Art History, Biology, Chemistry, Education, Business Organization, Political Forum, Philosophy, Pre-Med (36 Hours), Psychology and Sociology.

Arts/Performances clubs include the Emmanuel College Theatre Guild, Shakespeare Society, Acapocalypse, For Good Measure, Pep Band, Photography club, and more.

Community Service/volunteer clubs include the Emmanuel College Community Outreach (ECCO), Habitat for Humanity, Love Your Melon and Support Our Troops.

Since 2012, Emmanuel College has worked with Children's Miracle Network to hold an annual dance marathon, raising funds for childhood cancer research at Boston Children's Hospital.

There are a variety of cultural organizations, including an International Student Association, Asian Student Association, Black Student Union, Muslim Student Association, Latino Student Association, Irish Club, Italian Club, Gender Equality Club, and OUTspoken (LGBTQ).

Media/Publications groups include Emmanuel College Radio, Epilogue (Yearbook), Her Campus, Writer's Block, Spoon University, and The Hub (Newspaper).

Political/special interest groups include Political Forum, Model U.N., and Youth in Government

The Student Government/Programming Board groups include the Programming Team, Class Officers, Commuter Council, Residence Hall Councils and Student Government Association.

== Sexual assault cases ==
In 2016, a female student decided to leave Emmanuel College in her sophomore year to protest the fact that a male student she said had raped her in 2015 was found “not responsible” for assaulting her by the university administration, after administrators advised her to let the college handle the allegations, rather than police.

Her announcement, which complained that the university "did not think a rape kit and countless accounts of the night were sufficient evidence to find the male student [accountable]", received significant media attention. Boston.com reported, "The college issued a statement in response, and said it handles all cases in a comprehensive manner that fully complies with Title IX."

In 2018, a male student who was determined to be responsible for “all forms of sexual misconduct including any form of unwanted sexual advances and contact” during an academic hearing, was allowed to remain on campus. The student was later featured in an Emmanuel College athletics promotional video. The college's decision to feature him prompted the female student who made the allegations of assault to take to the matter to social media. Emmanuel's vice president of college relations, Molly DiLorenzo, later told the Boston Globe that the video “did not violate any conditions of the student conduct process,” but that “it is unfortunate that the posting happened.” DiLorenzo also told the Globe, “no individual found responsible for rape...has been allowed to remain enrolled at Emmanuel College.”

In 2020, The Spectrum reported that 10 rapes and 7 instances of nonconsensual fondling had been reported on the Emmanuel College campus between 2014 and 2019. Looking at the 2019 data, College Factual found that, in raw numbers, Emmanuel had more reported incidents of violence against women on campus than other universities nationwide. It also noted that 67% of college campuses recorded 0 instances of reported violence against women in the same period.

In a story on the sexual assault reports and their administrative handling, Emmanuel College campus newspaper, The Hub, noted that survivors' stories from 2015 onward shared the common theme, "the drive for justice and a need for change."

In response to allegations of sexual assault, students planned a series of protests, including a Day of Silence in May 2020, to raise attention to what organizers claim was the school's pattern of failure to adequately manage incidents of sexual assault on campus. The protestors called on President Janet Eisner and her administration to implement zero-tolerance sexual assault policies. The college responded to the protests with a Title IX listening session, and the initiation of a “campus climate task force.”

== Athletics ==
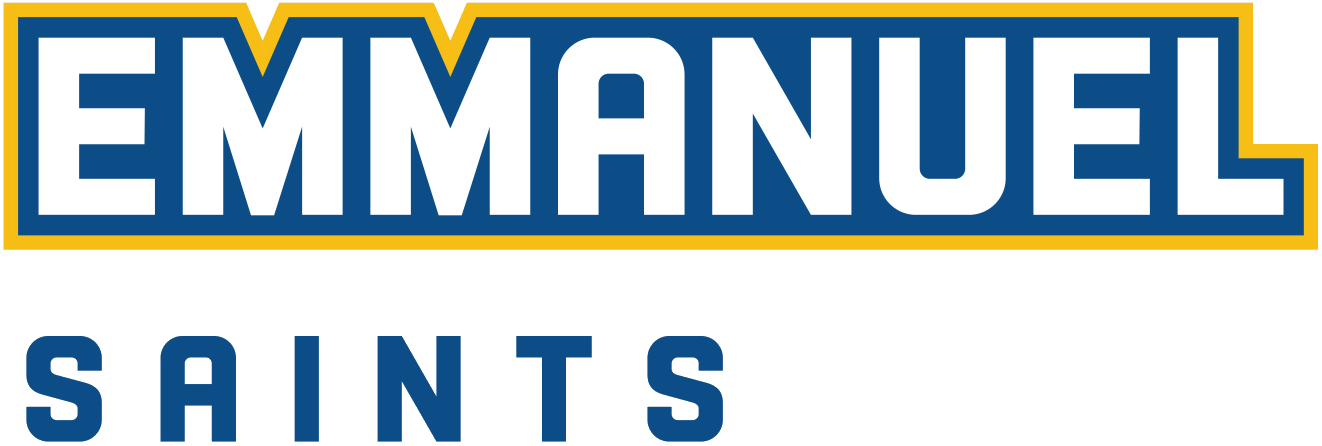
Emmanuel Saints wordmark

Emmanuel athletic teams are the Saints. The college is a member of the Division III level of the National Collegiate Athletic Association (NCAA), primarily competing in the Great Northeast Athletic Conference (GNAC) since the 1995–96 academic year.

Emmanuel competes in 16 intercollegiate varsity sports: Men's sports include basketball, cross country, golf, lacrosse, soccer, track & field (indoor and outdoor) and volleyball; while women's sports include basketball, cross country, lacrosse, soccer, softball, track & field (indoor and outdoor) and volleyball. Club and intramural sports include men's baseball, women's dance, women's field hockey, co-ed sailing and co-ed cheerleading. Former sports included women's tennis, which competed until after the 2013 spring season (2012–13 school year). Emmanuel began to sponsor men's sports since the college became co-educational, effective in the 2001–02 school year.

=== Clemente Field ===
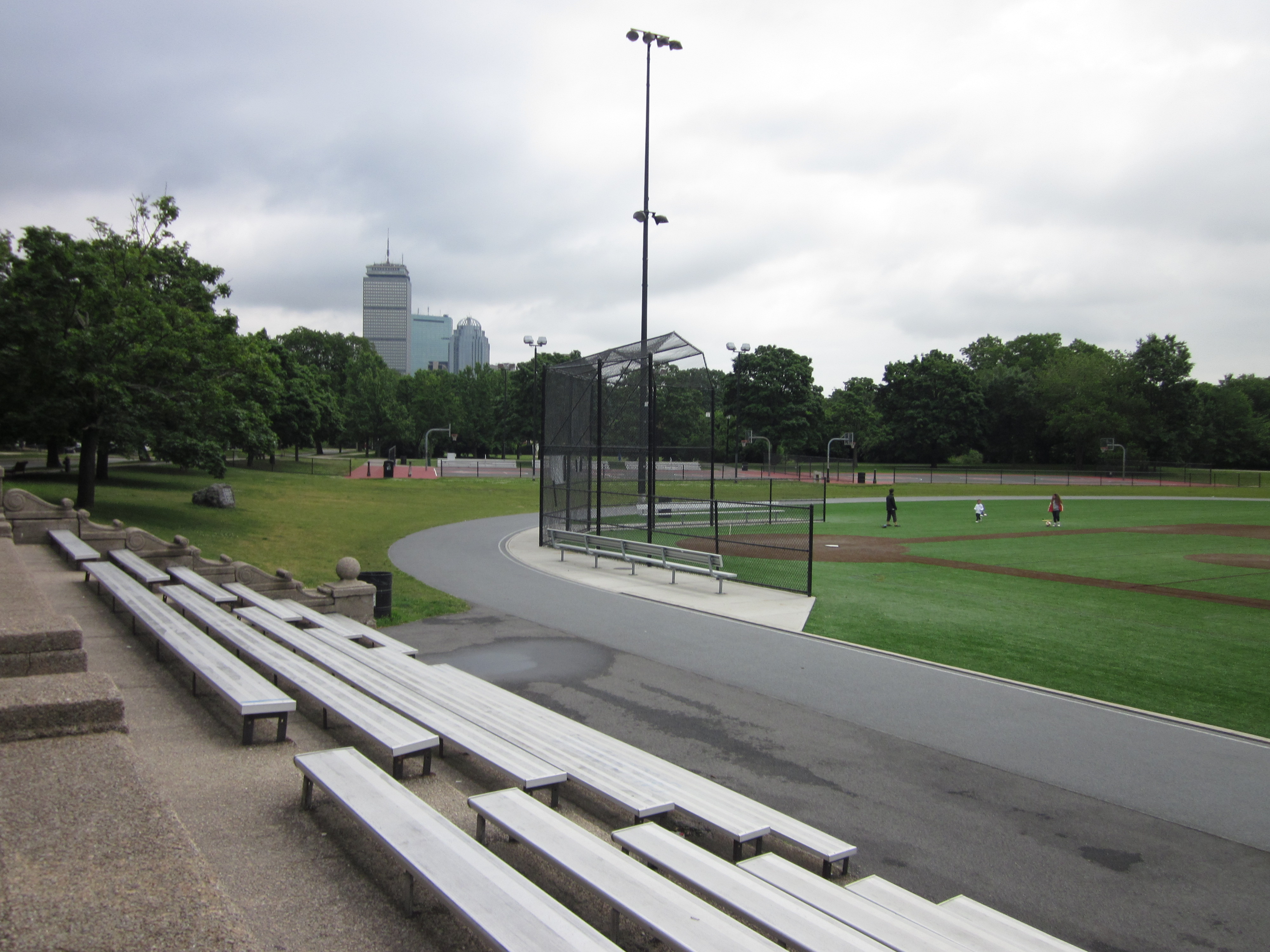
Roberto Clemente Field is home of several EC's sports teams

In the summer 2009, Emmanuel College partnered with the City of Boston for the $4 million comprehensive restoration of Roberto Clemente Field, a city-owned field located in the Back Bay Fens across the street from the campus in the Emerald Necklace. The renovations included an upgraded 120,000 sq. ft. NCAA-regulation synthetic turf field, a three-lane rubberized all-weather track, Musco lighting, practice facilities for expanded track and field events, a new scoreboard, as well as spectator stands and handicapped seating.

The field serves as home for Emmanuel softball, men's and women's soccer and women's lacrosse teams, as well as the practice facility for men's and women's track and field. The field is open to the public, and is used by Boston Latin School athletics, Fenway High School gym classes, Colleges of the Fenway intramurals, and adult and young summer softball leagues. The City of Boston-Emmanuel agreements is valid for 10 years and was revisited in 2019. The track is approximately 422 meters long.

== Notable people ==
- Mary McGrory, a Pulitzer Prize winning columnist. Placed on Nixon's Enemies List.
- Mary Beth Cahill, interim CEO of the Democratic National Committee and campaign manager for Senator John Kerry’s 2004 presidential run.
- Gregory John Hartmayer O.F.M. Conv., Archbishop of Atlanta
- Rebecca Hains, a communication and media studies scholar known for her expertise in children's media culture.
- Nancy Kerrigan, a figure skater who represented the United States at the 1992 Winter Olympics and the 1994 Winter Olympics.
- Marian T. Ryan, District Attorney of Middlesex County, Massachusetts. At one point the Commonwealth's only female District Attorney.
- Helen Vendler, a literary critic and distinguished Harvard University Professor.
- Brian Gallivan, actor and executive producer of sitcoms Sassy Gay Friend and The McCarthys.
- Dick Berggren, a motorsports announcer and editor, a former faculty member at the college.
- Linda McCarriston, an award-winning poet. Former professor at Vermont College, George Washington University, and Radcliffe College. Currently a professor at the University of Alaska Anchorage.

In addition to serving on the advisory board, John F. Kennedy gave the college's commencement speech in 1949.
