= Janet Eisner =

President of Emmanuel College

Sr. Janet Eisner SND
- Education: Emmanuel College AB, 1963 Boston College MA University of Michigan PhD
- Occupation: College President
- Title: Emmanuel College President
- Term: 1979-2022
- Predecessor: Sr. Mary Frances McCarthy, SND
- Successor: TBA
- Board member of: Colleges of the Fenway The Catholic University of America in Washington, D.C. St. Sebastian's School, Needham MA

Sr. Janet Eisner is the president emerita of Emmanuel College. During her presidency, she was the longest currently serving female president of a college in the United States, as well as the longest-serving president of a Catholic college or university between 1979 and 2022. She entered the Sisters of Notre Dame de Namur in 1958.

== Biography ==
=== Education ===
Eisner graduated from St. Mary's High School in Lynn, Massachusetts. She then earned her bachelor's degree in English at Emmanuel College, a master's degree from Boston College, and a PhD from the University of Michigan.

=== Role as president ===
Eisner was Emmanuel College's 12th president. She filled the role in September 1979 after serving as acting president in 1978. Prior to becoming president, Eisner served as a faculty member and a director of admissions at Emmanuel College.

During Eisner's tenure in the late 1980s and 1990s, the college's enrollment reached perilously low levels. In the early 2000s, Eisner oversaw decisions that helped increase the college's enrollment and avoid its closure through what she has called a series of "calculated risks." Specifically, in 2001, Emmanuel College welcomed its first coed class and also leased land to Merck in 2001, which improved and stabilized college finances due to steady income from having a private pharmaceutical research facility on campus. Although ending the college’s status as a women’s college was controversial, that decision, the Merck partnership, and other initiatives in the 2000 decade helped save the once-struggling college, tripling enrollments over 15 years.

Eisner has since been dubbed the "second founder" of Emmanuel College for these accomplishments, which reversed the course of her leadership and assured the college's future.

=== Service ===
Eisner has served on the boards or executive committees of the Medical Academic and Scientific Community Organization; the Colleges of the Fenway (Boston); The Catholic University of America (Washington, DC); and Saint John's Seminary (Brighton, MA), among others.

=== Honors received ===
- Honorary Doctorates: Northeastern University (1984), Boston College (2005), and the College of the Holy Cross (2013) have conferred honorary doctorates upon Eisner.
- Cheverus Award: The Archdiocese of Boston named Eisner as one of its 134 Cheverus Award recipients in 2017. The award recognizes parishioners (typically laypeople) who have been nominated by their parish pastor for service and whose nomination has been supported by their regional bishop or episcopal vicar and the cardinal.
- Carolyn and Peter Lynch Award: In 2022, Eisner received the Catholic Schools Foundation's the Carolyn and Peter Lynch award, bestowed annually "to individuals or organizations making a transformational difference in the lives of its more than 4,000 yearly scholarship recipients."
