= Massachusetts College of Pharmacy and Health Sciences =

American multi-campus private university

- Former names: MCPHS University
- Type: Private university
- Established: December 8, 1823; 202 years ago
- Accreditation: NECHE
- Affiliations: Colleges of the Fenway
- Endowment: $1.71 billion (2023)
- President: Richard J. Lessard
- Total staff: 1,591
- Students: 5,945 (fall 2024)
- Location: Boston, Worcester, and Manchester, United States; 42°20′12.9″N 71°6′5.2″W
- Campus: Urban 9 acres (36,421.7 m^{2})
- Colors: Cardinal and White
- Mascot: "Red" the Cardinal
- Website: www.mcphs.edu

Massachusetts College of Pharmacy and Health Sciences (MCPHS) is a private university focused on health- and life-sciences education, with campuses in Boston, Worcester, Massachusetts, and Manchester, New Hampshire, as well as online programs. The university provides traditional and accelerated programs of study focused on professional education in pharmacy and the health sciences.

== History ==
MCPHS was founded by fourteen Boston pharmacists as the Massachusetts College of Pharmacy in 1823 and is the oldest higher education institution in Boston. It is also the second-oldest and largest college of pharmacy in the United States, preceded only by the Philadelphia College of Pharmacy (Now the Philadelphia College of Pharmacy’s Doctor of Pharmacy program at Saint Joseph’s University), established in 1821. In 1825, the university published the First American Pharmaceutical Library Catalogue, detailing the effects of many pharmaceutical products. In 1852, the university obtained a charter from the Great Court of the Commonwealth of Massachusetts to award its first formal degree.

In 1918, the university built the George Robert White Building in the Longwood Medical Area in Boston, across from Harvard Medical School to serve as its main campus. In 1979, The General Court of the Commonwealth of Massachusetts approved a reform in the charter of the University to permit degree awarding authority in the allied health sciences, and the university formally changed its name to the Massachusetts College of Pharmacy and Allied Health Sciences.

The institution would later shorten its name to Massachusetts College of Pharmacy and Health Sciences (MCPHS). MCPHS added a campus in Worcester, Massachusetts, in 2000 and an expanded campus in Manchester, New Hampshire in 2002. Also in 2002, MCPHS obtained and integrated the Forsyth School of Dental Hygienists into the University by introducing an Oral Hygiene Course. During this period, MCPHS grew to include a School of Pharmacy, a School of Physician Assistant Studies, a School of Optometry, a School of Physical Therapy, a School of Arts and Sciences, School of Nursing, a School of Dental Hygiene, and a School of Medical Imaging and Therapeutics, School of Healthcare Business, School of Occupational Therapy, and School of Acupuncture.

In the spring of 2013, the institution legally modified its name to MCPHS University to represent this growth and the variety of programs it provides while retaining its acronym "MCPHS." In April 2016, MCPHS acquired the New England School of Acupuncture (NESA).

In 2017, the school was dealing with overcrowding after a surge in enrollment. In 2018, MCPHS added new residence halls and did extensive renovations. In 2019 the school received an award for restoring the Duncan and Goodell Building at 34 Mechanic Street in Worcester and also added the School of Professional Studies.

In 2021, the university reverted to using its full name as the Massachusetts College of Pharmacy and Health Sciences.

== Campuses ==
=== Boston ===
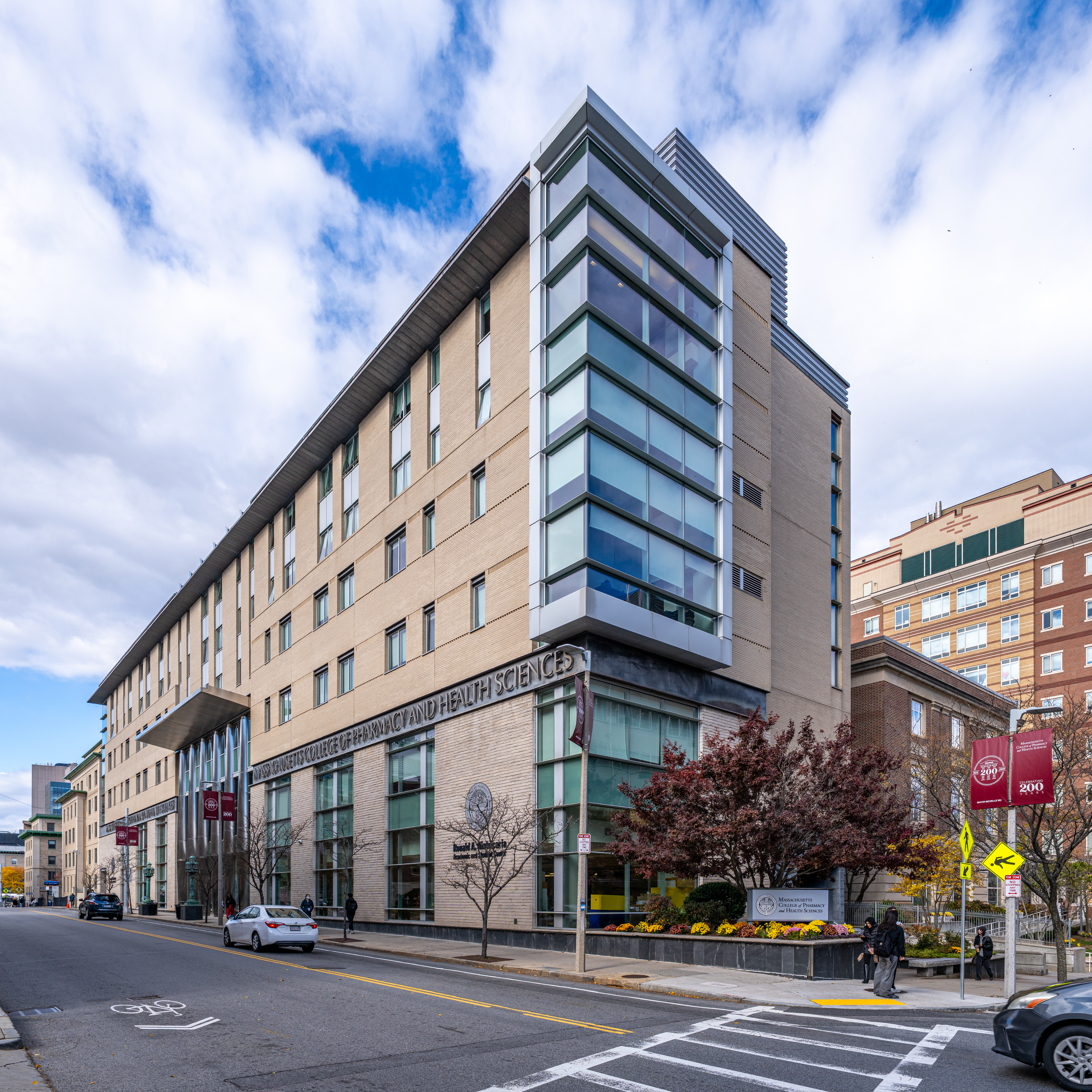
Located in Longwood Medical and Academic Area (2025)

The Boston MCPHS campus is based at 179 Longwood Avenue, in the Longwood Medical and Academic Area. It is next to the Massachusetts College of Art and Design and Harvard Medical School, and near health care institutions such as Boston Children's Hospital, Dana–Farber Cancer Institute, Brigham and Women's Hospital, and Beth Israel Deaconess Medical Center. The Boston campus consists of three major buildings: the George Robert White Building, the Ronald A. Matricaria Academic and Student Center and the John Richard Fennell Building, which are all structurally integrated with the student dormitories.

The Richard E. Griffin Academic Center, a fourth building, opened in January 2009 to house the university's School of Nursing, School of Physician Assistant Studies, School of Medical Imaging and Therapeutics, Center for Professional Career Development, and University Development. The six-story, triangular structure comprises approximately 50,000 square feet (4,600 m2) of classrooms, faculty and personnel offices, and labs for patient examination and clinical simulation teaching. The building also has a computing and education centre, and an auditorium with 230 seats.

Beginning in the 2024-2025 academic year, the university took over three floors comprising approximately 44,000 square feet of One Palace Road, an academic building owned by Simmons University. Cafeterias, bookstore, gyms, additional residence halls, and health services are shared with neighboring Colleges of the Fenway institutions.

The MCPHS testing laboratories are designed for each of the specialty academic fields. There are such specialist laboratories as a radioisotope testing collection, a product development laboratory equipped for drug production designed for medicinal tableting, coating and encapsulation and a facility to manufacture liquids, ointments, and sterile cosmetic products. Instruments available include infrared, ultraviolet, and nuclear magnetic resonance spectrometers, gas chromatographs, and high-pressure liquid chromatographs. Facilities for machine and animal testing are accessible too. Additionally, services for testing equipment, although not accessible on site, are accessible via clinical and academic affiliations with other universities in the Greater Boston/Cambridge region.

=== Worcester ===
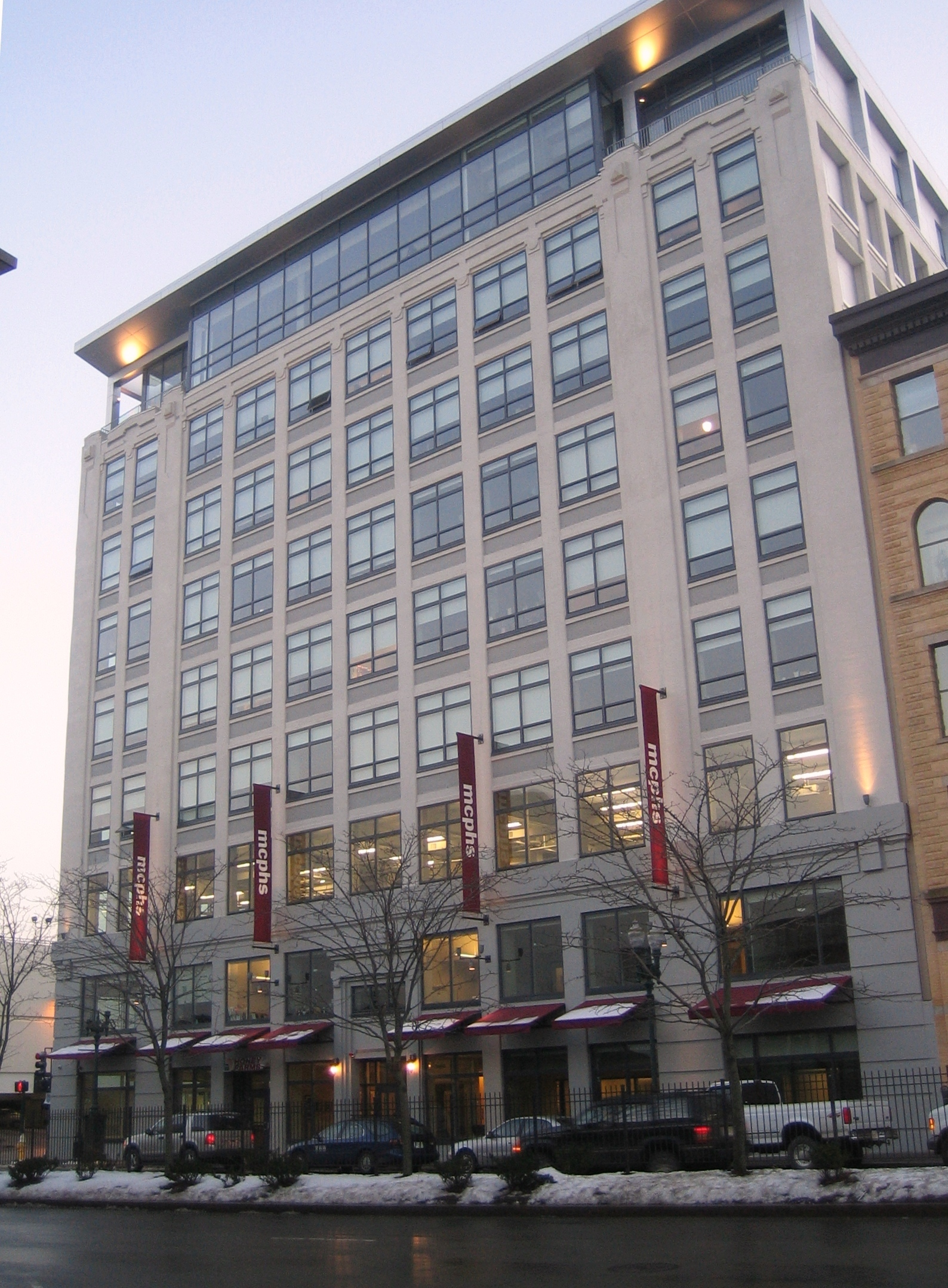
The Thomas Henry Borysek Living and Learning Center of MCPHS Worcester

Located at 19, 25, 40 Foster Street, 28 Mechanics Street, 19 Norwich Street, and 10 Lincoln Square in Downtown Worcester, Massachusetts, MCPHS' Worcester campus houses the institution's accelerated programs in Nursing, Family Nurse Practitioner, Dental Hygiene, Diagnostic Medical Sonography, and Doctor of Pharmacy as well as the Master of Physician Assistant Studies program, two Master of Acupuncture programs, Doctor of Physical Therapy program, and the Doctor of Optometry program, for post-baccalaureate students.

MCPHS Worcester is composed of three main buildings that are known collectively as The Thomas Henry Borysek Living and Learning Center. The Thomas Henry Borysek Living and Learning Center houses administrative and faculty offices, conference rooms, classrooms, a technology center, patient assessment and clinical simulation laboratories, and six floors of suite-style student housing (all with private bedrooms). The basement provides comfortable group study/social (lounge) space for students. A portion of the ninth floor also houses a spacious room, the Fuller Conference Room, designed for conferences, board meetings, receptions and other University gatherings.

On September 21, 2009, MCPHS officially opened a new academic center in downtown Worcester, the Maher Academic Building at 40 Foster Street. The building houses 30,000 square feet of academic and student space. Two 250-seat auditoria and three "smart" classrooms feature interactive technology. The street-level multipurpose laboratory includes a model pharmacy that simulates community and institutional practice environments. There is also a student lounge, student meeting rooms, quiet study areas, and faculty offices.

In mid-June 2010, MCPHS acquired the property at 10 Lincoln Square (formerly the Crowne Plaza Hotel). This 250,000-square-foot building offers furnished rooms, parking, a fitness center, dining hall, outdoor patio, and green space. It is also home to two clinics open to the public: the Eye and Vision Center and the Forsyth Dental Hygiene Clinic.

The 28 Mechanic Street building is home to MCPHS Online, which was formed in 2011. This physical facility houses the MCPHS Online staff members charged with the development and oversight of MCPHS Online programs.

The New England School of Acupuncture treatment center and programs are housed in the 19 Norwich Street building.

=== Manchester ===
MCPHS expanded to Manchester, New Hampshire in 2002, acquiring Notre Dame College's Physician Assistant program after that college closed. A Nursing program was added in 2007. The campus is located at 1260 Elm Street. Pharmacy and Occupational Therapy programs are also available.

The three-story Elm Street building, known as the Brant Academic Student Center, houses the school’s Student Affairs, counseling, admissions, and financial advising offices, as well as several classrooms, laboratories, and study spaces.

The Brant Building, established in 2017, accommodates the Occupational Therapy program, with both pediatric and adult labs for students to practice in environments designed to simulate a patient’s living and working space. Study spaces and conference rooms are also located in the building.

Students complete clinical rotations at the nearby Catholic Medical Center, Elliot Hospital, St. Joseph Hospital, and Southern New Hampshire Medical Center.

== Academics ==
MCPHS is composed of twelve distinct schools:

- New England School of Acupuncture
- Forsyth School of Dental Hygiene
- School of Arts and Sciences
- School of Healthcare Business and Technology
- School of Medical Imaging and Therapeutics
- School of Nursing
- School of Occupational Therapy
- School of Optometry
- School of Pharmacy
- School of Physical Therapy
- School of Physician Assistant Studies
- School of Professional Studies

In 2016, the New England School of Acupuncture (NESA) combined with MCPHS's Worcester campus. The NESA was established in 1974, making it the oldest acupuncture school in the United States.

== College relations ==
Colleges of the Fenway

MCPHS Boston is a member of the Colleges of the Fenway, a collegiate consortium in the Longwood Medical and Academic Area. The association promotes collaboration between local schools, both academically and with buildings. The consortium includes MCPHS, Emmanuel College, MassArt, Simmons, and Wentworth Institute of Technology. Students are able to cross register between institutions and participate in shared social events planned by the Colleges of the Fenway and various groups throughout the campus. Students may also live at either their school of attendance, or in the campus dormitories of the other member schools. Collectively, the colleges represent more than 12,000 undergraduate students, 16.2% of the total Boston population of undergraduates attending four-year colleges, with around 700 full-time faculty and 1,500 course offerings.

MCPHS Worcester is a member of the Colleges of Worcester Consortium, a collaboration of twelve academic institutions which work to further the individual missions of the member institutions while advancing higher education in the region.

MCPHS has partnerships with a variety of medical institutions to supplement its educational programs in the Premedical and Health Studies. Educational instruction may be provided by institutions such as Ross University School of Medicine for general medicine and Ross University School of Veterinary Medicine for veterinary medicine, Lake Erie College of Osteopathic Medicine for Dental Medicine, Lake Erie College of Osteopathic Medicine for Osteopathic Medicine, and A. T. Still University for Osteopathic Medicine.

== See also ==
- Category: Massachusetts College of Pharmacy and Health Sciences alumni
