= Mark Cesark =

American sculptor (born 1965)

Mark Cesark (born September 16, 1965, in Summit, New Jersey) is an American sculptor, best known for his use of found and scrap steel.

Cesark, from Summit, New Jersey, earned his undergraduate degree from Alfred University in New York in 1989. Afterward, he completed a Master of Fine Arts at the Massachusetts College of Art in Boston.

Cesark scavenges junk yards and farms looking for interesting pieces of steel, which he assembles into his wall sculptures. Irony plays a part in his art, as that has been discarded and lost is now revived into art.

His greatest influences are Mark Rothko, Jackson Pollock, and other post-war movements and artists. Cesark's minimalist works hide their humble materials.

Cesark's work can be found in several collections, including the DeCordova Museum in Lincoln, Massachusetts. His one-person exhibitions include the Adelson Gallery of the Aspen Institute in 1998, and Barbara Singer Fine Arts in Cambridge, Massachusetts in 1993.

Cesark resides in Colorado with his wife Katherine and two children, Niko and Owen.

== See also ==
- Scrap
- Recyclable waste
