= Vahe Aghabegians =

Iranian advisor

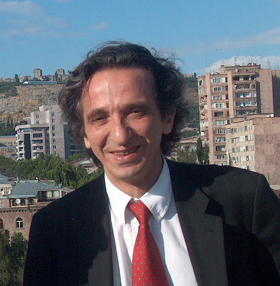
- Born: November 26, 1952 (age 73); Tehran, Iran
- Education: Wentworth Institute of Technology Northeastern University Electrical Engineering
- Occupation: Technology Adviser
- Notable work: Adviser to the Minister of Foreign Affairs of Armenia (1999-2007) managing director of "Lincey Foreign Investment" Project Implementation Unit (PIU) (2000-2002)

Vahe Aghabegians (Armenian: Վահէ Աղաբեկեանց, born November 26, 1952, Tehran) is a technology adviser to the Armenian government. His childhood education occurred in Armenian schools of Teheran. After graduating from high school, in 1973, he left for the United States, where he attended Wentworth Institute of Technology and Northeastern University in Boston and received a BS in Electrical Engineering in 1978.

From 1975 to 1979, he was employed by Hairenik Association, Inc. (a publishing house) as operations manager. Was a founding member and executive director of UniPrint Inc. (a printing house). From 1982 to 1984, he was the president of The Romney Group, Inc., (a national sporting goods distribution company). Founded, and from 1984 to 1998, was the president and chief executive officer of MicroComp Enterprises, Inc.

In June 1998, Aghabegians moved to Armenia and from 1999 to 2007, he worked as Adviser to the Minister of Foreign Affairs of Armenia, Vartan Oskanian. From 2000 to 2002, he was assigned the managing director of "Lincey Foreign Investment" Project Implementation Unit (PIU) with the Ministry of Finance of Armenia.

While at the Ministry of Foreign Affairs, he conceptualized and implemented Armenia's Electronic Visa (eVisa) system (2003). From June 19, 2007 to June 11, 2008, Aghabegians served as the Executive Director of the Hayastan All Armenian Fund (The Armenia Fund).

In its March 2004 issue, the National Geographic magazine published a 22-page article (the result of a total of 93 interviews) written by Frank Viviano, highlighting Armenia. The feature, titled "The Rebirth of Armenia," describes the present day Armenia with photographs and maps. The article includes a brief profile of Vahe Aghabegians, a high technology advisor to the Armenian government, Aghabegians hopes to "shepherd Armenia into the 21st century industrial world."
