= Russell Colley =

Russell Sidney Colley
- Born: July 22, 1897; Stoneham, Massachusetts
- Died: February 4, 1996 (aged 98); Springfield, Ohio
- Education: Wentworth Institute of Technology

Russell Sidney Colley (July 22, 1897 – February 4, 1996) was a U. S. mechanical engineer who played a role in creating the spacesuits worn by the Project Mercury astronauts, including fitting Alan B. Shepard Jr. for his historic ride as America's first man in space on May 5, 1961.

== Early life ==
Colley was born in Stoneham, Massachusetts on July 22, 1897. He originally wanted to design women's clothing, but his parents strongly urged him to enroll at the Wentworth Institute (now Wentworth Institute of Technology), from which he graduated in 1918.

In 1928, Colley moved to Akron, Ohio to become a mechanical engineer for the B. F. Goodrich Co. There, he made the "Riv-nut" that allowed a single worker to affix rivets to airplane wings. Also, after fellow engineer William Geer came up with the idea for the first aircraft de-icer in 1932, Colley was asked to make the device operational. Colley then tested the device during a storm that had grounded every other plane, according to a story in the Akron Beacon Journal. Plane de-icers became - and still are - a major product for Goodrich.

== Developing pressure suits ==
In 1934, Colley was handed a new assignment: help pioneering pilot Wiley Post reach the jet stream and break new altitude records. Post needed a pressurized suit, and Colley designed him one using his wife's sewing machine. The pressure suit had three layers: the innermost one was long underwear, the middle layer was a rubberized air pressure bladder, and the outer layer was made of rubberized parachute fabric. Rubber boots, pigskin gloves, and a diver's helmet with a removable faceplate were added.

Post tried the suit on September 5, 1935 and reached an altitude of 40,000 feet, an unofficial record. He eventually reached 47,000 feet in the suit.

In the 1940s, Colley helped design the Goodrich XH-5 full-pressure suit for the U.S. Army Air Force, which was inspired by the segments of a tomato worm Colley observed in his garden. Colley and his collaborators were awarded a patent for this suit in 1946.

Colley continued to develop full-pressure suits for the U.S. Navy during the 1940s and 1950s, and appeared as a guest on the TV program What's My Line? in 1959.

With Carl F. Effler and Donald D. Ewing, Colley led the design of the Goodrich space suits used by the Mercury astronauts, modified versions of the Navy Mark IV pressure suit. All six original Mercury astronauts went to Akron to be fitted by Colley for their suits, which were two-ply silver nylon coated with neoprene.

After Shepard's flight aboard Freedom 7, the Akron press dubbed Colley "First Tailor of the Space Age" and Goodrich saluted him as "Father of the Spacesuit".

Colley also designed special gloves worn by John Glenn, when he became the first American to orbit space in 1962. Glenn wanted the fingertips to light up so he could see his instrument panel, since lighting in the spaceship was sacrificed to keep the weight down.

Glenn often floated around the spaceship using the fingertips for light, near the end of his 1962 orbit, he described his last few moments in space as a "lights out" experience, as the lights malfunctioned in his fingertips leaving him without any way to see.

== Later life and hobbies and death ==
Colley received NASA's Distinguished Public Service Medal in 1994.

Colley collected 65 patents in his career. When he retired from NASA, he returned to Ohio, where he practiced jewelry design with his exquisite gem cuts, featured in The Lapidary Journal.

A watercolor artist, Colley was an original member of the Whiskey Painters of America, founded in 1951 in Akron by industrial designer Joe Ferriot. Colley and others perfected the genre of painting miniature watercolors using alcohol as the medium.

Russell Colley died February 4, 1996, in Springfield, Ohio.
