= Elizabeth Hamilton Huntington =

American painter

- Born: October 8, 1878; South Braintree, Massachusetts
- Died: 1963 (aged 84–85); Wellesley, Massachusetts
- Education: Massachusetts College of the Arts
- Known for: Still Life, Floral

Elizabeth Hamilton Huntington (October 8, 1878 – 1963) was a 20th-century American painter best known for her still life and floral paintings, often executed in pastel on paper.

== Early life and education ==
Elizabeth Hamilton Thayer (later Elizabeth Hamilton Huntington) was born in South Braintree, Massachusetts in 1878. Elizabeth Huntington’s family apparently believed or claimed that Florence Hamilton’s family descended from Alexander Hamilton, but no supporting line of descent has been demonstrated.

She attended the Massachusetts College of the Arts in Boston where she studied under Ernest Lee Major.

== Career ==
During her engagement to her future husband, Raymond, Huntington was diagnosed with polio that paralyzed the right side of her body. In order to continue painting she had to manipulate her non-functional right arm using her left arm. Huntington's husband hand made a desk that could be fit to a car in order for her to paint.

Huntington's disability greatly affected her ability to take part in the art community of Boston. Huntington created a salon in her home, where people would show their art and give lectures. In 1933, this group became officially known as the Wellesley Society of Artists The WSA is still in operation today.

Huntington's work was exhibited in the late 2000s and early 2010s both at Fruitlands Museum in Harvard, Massachusetts and at the now-defunct Floria Museum for Women Artists in DeLand, Florida. Huntington's work was collected by champions of the unknown, like Samuel M. Robbins of Newton, Massachusetts.

== Personal life ==
Huntington married Raymond Edwards Huntington on June 9, 1909 in Wollaston, Massachusetts.

== Death and legacy ==
Huntington painted until her death in 1963.

Huntington left approximately 5,000 works in oil, pastel, and watercolor.

A collection of her materials is held at the Smithsonian Institution's Archives of American Art and the Peabody Essex Museum library.

== Exhibitions ==
- 2009: The Nature of Apples, Fruitlands Museum
- White Mountain Artists 1840-1940, Florida Museum for Women Artists
- New England Impressionists Rediscovered, Fruitlands Museum

== Books ==
Huntington's book, Water Colors by Elizabeth T. Huntington was published in Boston in 1939.

Huntington's paintings are featured in several exhibition catalogs/books, including:

- Paintings by American Women: Selections from the Collection of Louise and Alan Sellars (1989)
- Women Artists in the White Mountains, 1940-1940 (1990)
- Things of Beauty: Floral Still-Lifes: Selected from the Louise and Alan Sellars Collection of Art by American Women (1992)
