= Cindy Stumpo =

American entrepreneur and general contractor

- Born: Cindy Robin Leonard; 1965 (age 60–61)
- Other name: Cindy Leonard Stumpo
- Education: Newton South High School
- Alma mater: Wentworth Institute of Technology
- Known for: Founder, C. Stumpo Development
- Spouse: Formerly married to Joe Stumpo
- Children: Samantha Stumpo & Chad Stumpo
- Parent(s): Leonard & Beverly Marlene Hartstone
- Website: www.cstumpodevelopment.com

Cindy Stumpo is an American entrepreneur and residential contractor. She is the founder of C. Stumpo Development, a privately owned custom home builder and developer based in eastern Massachusetts. Stumpo and her work have been featured in numerous national publications, including Forbes Magazine calling her one of the most successful residential contractors in Massachusetts. Her construction work became a television series HGTV called Tough As Nails. WBZ News Radio tapped Stumpo to continue her work in the media, "Cindy Stumpo is Tough As Nails" is now a weekly radio show on iHeart Radio. The show is about "building a house, and building a life".

== Early life and education ==
Stumpo was born Cindy Robin Leonard in Brookline, Massachusetts in 1956 to Robert Leonard and Beverly Hartstone. Her father is half Jewish and half Sicilian, and her mother was born into a Jewish family. Her family name was originally Leonardi, but her grandfather changed the family name to Leonard. Stumpo grew up in West Peabody, Massachusetts and Newton, Massachusetts, attributing both towns to her career success. She graduated from Newton High School and went on to earn her degree in General Construction from Wentworth Institute of Technology in Boston, Massachusetts.

Stumpo was not eligible to be grandfathered in as a contractor because her father nor her grandfather were contractors. Subsequently, she had to take the test for her general contractors license. She passed the test on her first try and became one of the first women in Massachusetts to receive licensure without being grandfathered.

== Career ==
Stumpo founded C. Stumpo Development when she was 24 years old. She began her career in real estate speculation by building and selling houses. She moved into custom building and built her first million-dollar home in 1990. Her home designs soon became known throughout the Boston-area, earning her a reputation as successful home builder.

Stumpo starred in a television series for HGTV called Tough As Nails. The docudrama followed Stumpo on the job site where she worked as the foreman, giving instructions to the workers on various construction projects and managing her household as a single mother of two. The show ran for an entire season of 13 episodes throughout 2010. She has since become a home builder/remodeling expert for Curbed Magazine as well as speaking at TEDx Lowell in 2014.

Stumpo has appeared in numerous publications including Curbed, Forbes Magazine, Boston Common, Upscale Living Cocktails and Joints, Paper Cut Magazine, The Boston Herald, and The Boston Globe. She speaks at numerous events with a stated goal of getting more women involved in construction. Stumpo was a featured speaker at the 2014 MA Conference for Women, where Hillary Clinton was the keynote speaker. She was also a featured speaker at the Boston Ad Club at the Women's Leadership Forum.

== Awards and recognition ==
Stumpo has been the recipient of several Builder of the Year awards as well as being named Woman of the Year by Magic 106.7 FM in Boston. Her firm was named one of the Top 100 Women-Led Businesses in Massachusetts by The Boston Globe in 2014. The same year she received the Inspirational Woman of the Year award from Brookview House.
