= MaPo Kinnord =

American artist (b. 1960)

- Born: September 30, 1960 (age 65); Cleveland, Ohio, U.S.
- Education: Massachusetts College of Art, Ohio State University
- Known for: Ceramic, Sculpture

MaPo Kinnord (born 1960 in Cleveland, OH) is an artist and educator based in New Orleans, Louisiana.

== Early life and education ==
Kinnord grew up in Cleveland, Ohio. She completed her BFA at Massachusetts College of Art in Boston, and received her MFA from Ohio State University in Columbus. In 1995 she moved to New Orleans, LA where she met one of her mentors, John T. Scott.

== Work ==
Using ceramic sculptural forms resembling mud huts of Ghana, Kinnord's work is about ancestral memory. She has spent time in Northern Ghana creating a research video on pottery and ceramic architecture. Much of her work is inspired by architecture and explores both exteriors and interiors through clay and surface treatment. She has also compared the way she works with clay to jazz, improvisational but with structure.

Part of Kinnord's work as an educator includes art therapy manipulating clay with meditation. She was an instructor at Penland School of Crafts, in North Carolina, Haystack Mountain School of Craft in Maine. Kinnord taught in MassArt in Massachusetts and Berkeley California before moving to New Orleans in 1995 where she became an associate professor of art at Xavier University of Louisiana.

Kinnord's work has been exhibited Internationally including at Arthur Roger Gallery, Tulane University, Baltimore Clayworks, Stella Jones Gallery, Swarthmore College, Contemporary Arts Center in New Orleans, Ogden Museum of Southern Art, and Imago Mundi.

In 2017 her work was included in an exhibition called Congregation at Antenna Gallery. In 2018 Kinnord's work was included in The Whole Drum Will Sound: Women in Southern Abstraction at the Ogden Museum of Southern Art alongside works by Lynda Benglis, Dusti Bongé, Clyde Connell, Dorothy Hood, Marie Hull, Lin Emery, Margaret Evangeline, Cynthia Brants, Jacqueline Humphries, Valerie Jaudon and Ida Kohlmeyer.
