= Colleges of the Fenway =

Consortium of colleges in the Fenway region of Boston, Massachusetts

Colleges of the Fenway

The Colleges of the Fenway (COF) is a consortium of five colleges located in or near the Fenway neighborhood of Boston, Massachusetts. The association promotes collaboration among its member schools to enhance the variety of educational programs; to gain economics benefits through shared research, medical, and dining facilities; and to provide students, faculty, and staff with the opportunity to study, live, teach, and work in a small college environment while enjoying the resources of a major academic environment comparable to that of a large-scale university setting.

== Member institutions ==
As of 2024, there are five member institutions:

- Emmanuel College
- Massachusetts College of Art and Design (MassArt)
- Massachusetts College of Pharmacy and Health Sciences
- Simmons University
- Wentworth Institute of Technology

Until 2018, Wheelock College was also a member until it merged into Boston University as the Boston University Wheelock College of Education & Human Development.

== Collaboration ==
The five colleges, each with its own unique mission, offer specialized learning and experiences on and off campus. Collectively, the COF represent more than 12,000 full-time undergraduate students (16.2% of all students attending four-year colleges in greater Boston), nearly 700 full-time faculty, and more than 2,300 course offerings. Shared initiatives among the five colleges are aimed at enhancing the quality of education, enriching student experiences and reducing costs through sharing of resources. For example, the second floor of a new dormitory at MassArt is a Student Health Center, shared by students of MassArt, Wentworth Institute of Technology, and MCPHS University.

The Consortium has an agreement with the Isabella Stewart Gardner Museum to extend University Membership benefits to all associated students, faculty, and staff.

Collaborative student opportunities include formal cross-registration which allows access to over 1,500 courses otherwise not available on the student's home campus. Students may use career centers, intramural sports, performing arts, student life programs and activities, and study-abroad opportunities at other schools in the consortium. Students may also participate in shared social events planned by the Colleges of the Fenway and various groups throughout the campuses. Students may live at their school of attendance or in the campus dormitories of the other member schools.

Each October, the Colleges of the Fenway join with other local organizations in an "Opening Our Doors" public celebration of artistic and cultural activities in the Fenway and Huntington Avenue districts of Boston.
