= Wentworth Institute of Technology =

Private university in Boston, Massachusetts, US

Coordinates: 42.336611°N 71.095019°W

- Former name: Wentworth Institute (1904–1977)
- Motto: Education that's worth it. Wentworth.
- Founded: April 5, 1904; 122 years ago
- Opened: September 25, 1911; 115 years ago
- Type: Private university
- Affiliations: AICUM; Colleges of the Fenway; NAAB
- President: Mark A. Thompson
- Provost: Sophia Maggelakis
- Faculty: 134
- Students: 4,191 (fall 2024)
- Undergraduates: 3,965 (fall 2024)
- Postgraduates: 226 (fall 2024)
- Location: Boston, Massachusetts, United States
- Campus: Urban, 31 acres (13 ha)
- Athletics: NCAA Division III; 17 varsity teams
- Colors: Wentworth Gold and Rich Black and Bright Red
- Sporting affiliations: NCAA Division III - CNE; NEISA
- Mascot: Leopard
- Website: wit.edu
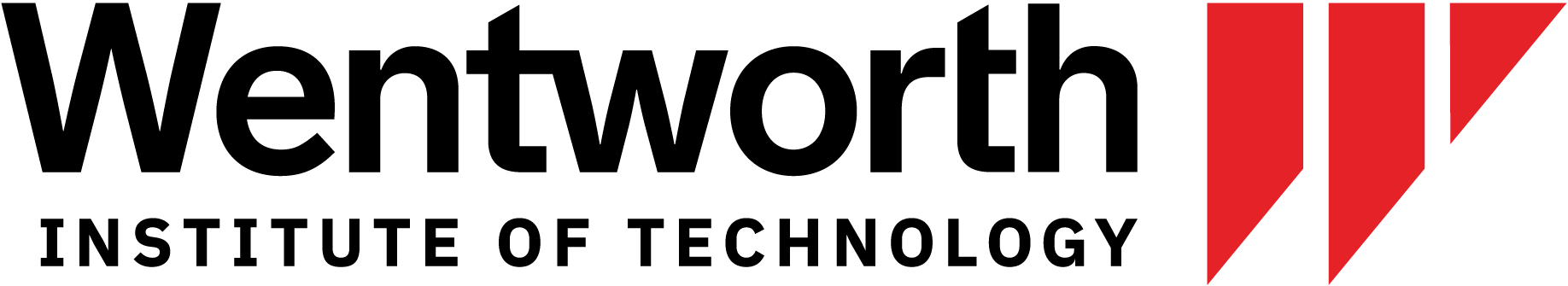

Wentworth Institute of Technology (WIT) is a private university in Boston, Massachusetts, United States. Wentworth was founded in 1904 and offers career-focused education through 22 bachelor's degree programs as well as 11 master's degrees.

== History ==
In 1903, Boston marble supplier and landlord Arioch Wentworth donated the majority of his estate, estimated at $7 million, to found an industrial school within Boston. A board of seven directors incorporated Wentworth Institute on April 5, 1904, as a school "to furnish education in the mechanical arts". The directors spent several years investigating the educational needs of the community, increased the endowment, and reached a settlement with Wentworth's daughter, who had contested his will. Frederick Atherton was Trustee Secretary. The campus was established in Boston's Back Bay Fens and Arthur L. Williston was the first principal of the college.

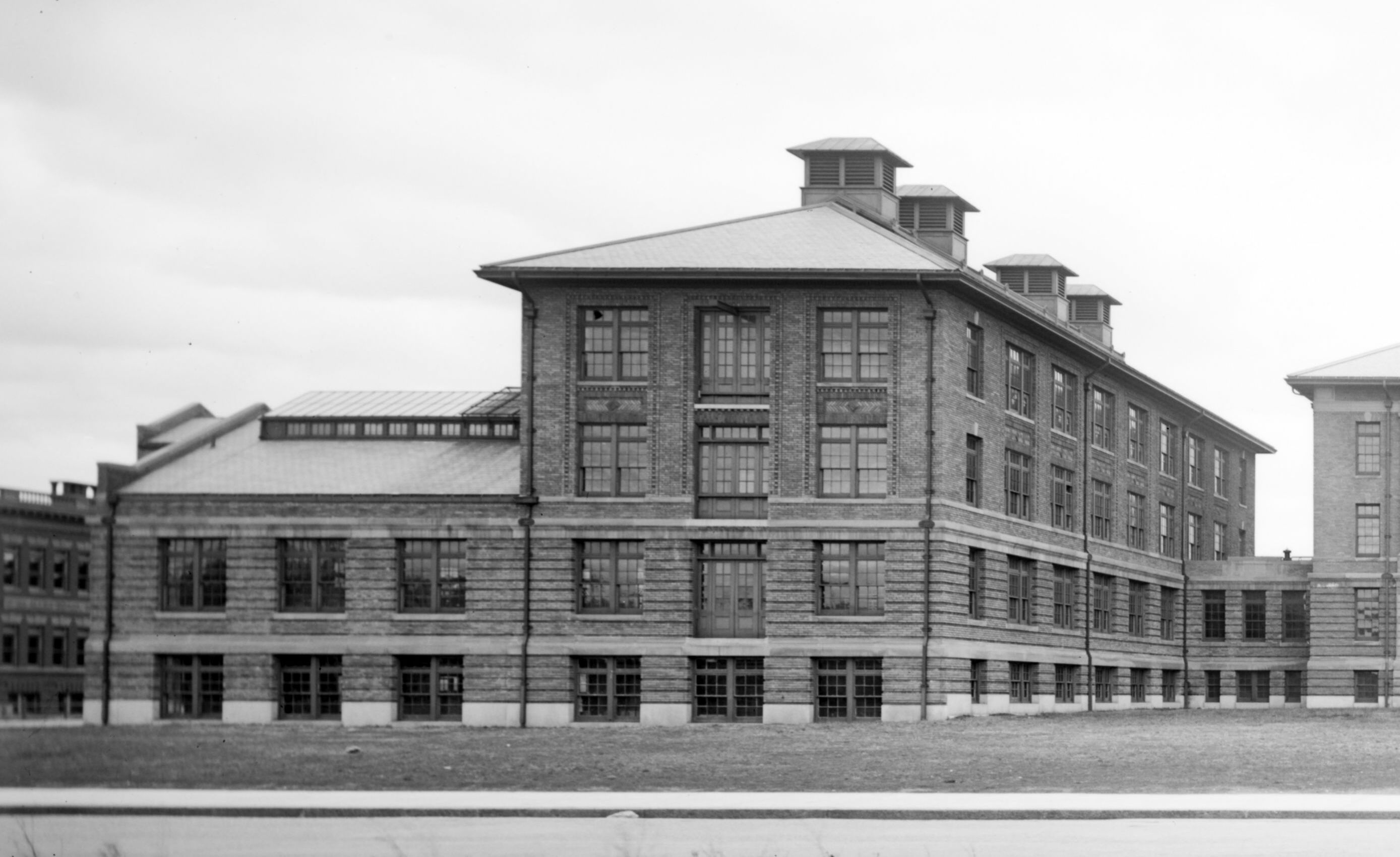
Dobbs Hall in 1920

On September 25, 1911, Wentworth opened as a technical school to 242 students. By 1919, the school had 1,800 students and 45 teachers. Wentworth became a degree-granting institution in 1957 and awarded its first baccalaureate-level degrees in 1970.

In 1972, the institute admitted its first female students. In 1973, Wentworth instructors unionized to join the American Federation of Teachers and on October 28, 1977, the teachers of Wentworth went on strike. In 1977, the college's lower and upper divisions merged as the Wentworth Institute of Technology. Wentworth acquired the former Ira Allen School building from the city of Boston in 1980 and the former Boston Trade High School in 1983.

In November 2009, Wentworth became a master's degree-granting institution, with the creation and accreditation of its master of architecture program. Wentworth received approval for university status from the Massachusetts Department of Higher Education in July 2017.

Zorica Pantic was the first female engineer to head an institute of technology in higher education in the United States. She was president from 2005 to 2019.

== Academics ==
As of January 2024, Wentworth offered bachelor's degrees in 22 engineering, technology, design, and management disciplines. Wentworth also offered 11 master's degrees, 7 of which had an online option. In 2024, Wentworth was ranked #33 amongst Regional Universities North by U.S. News & World Report.

== Campus ==
The Wentworth campus is located in the Fenway neighborhood of Boston. It consists of 15 buildings for administrative and faculty offices, classrooms, laboratories, library, and athletic facilities. Students enrolled for full-time study may live in one of seven residence halls near the main campus buildings.

The institute's collaborating neighbors include the Massachusetts College of Art and Design, Northeastern University, the Massachusetts College of Pharmacy and Health Sciences, and the Museum of Fine Arts.

Wentworth is a member of the Colleges of the Fenway consortium, and shares many facilities and activities with nearby institutions. With this membership, Wentworth students are entitled to register for course with participating neighboring institutions at no additional cost.

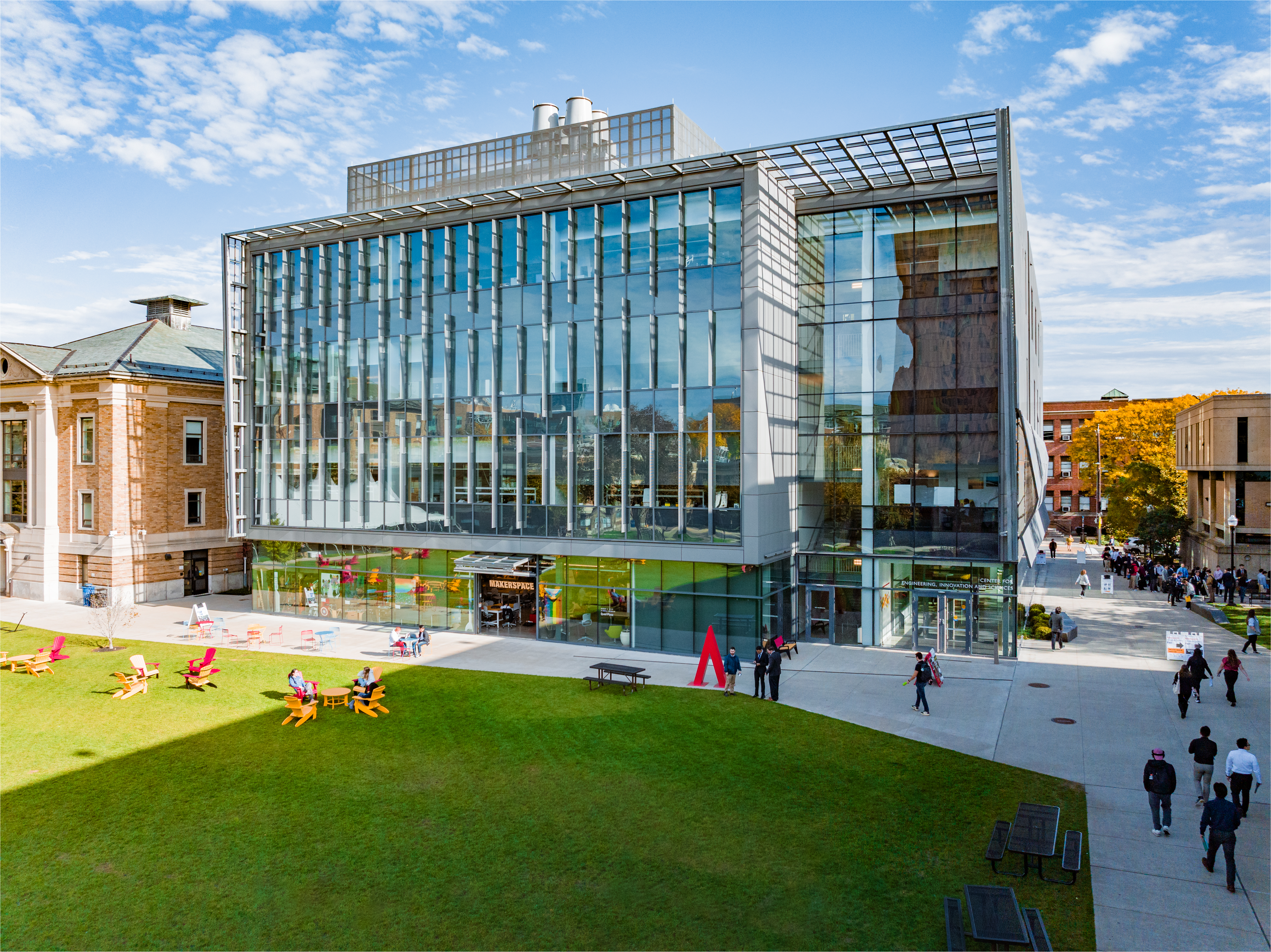
Center for Engineering, Innovation and Technology with Watson Hall on the far left

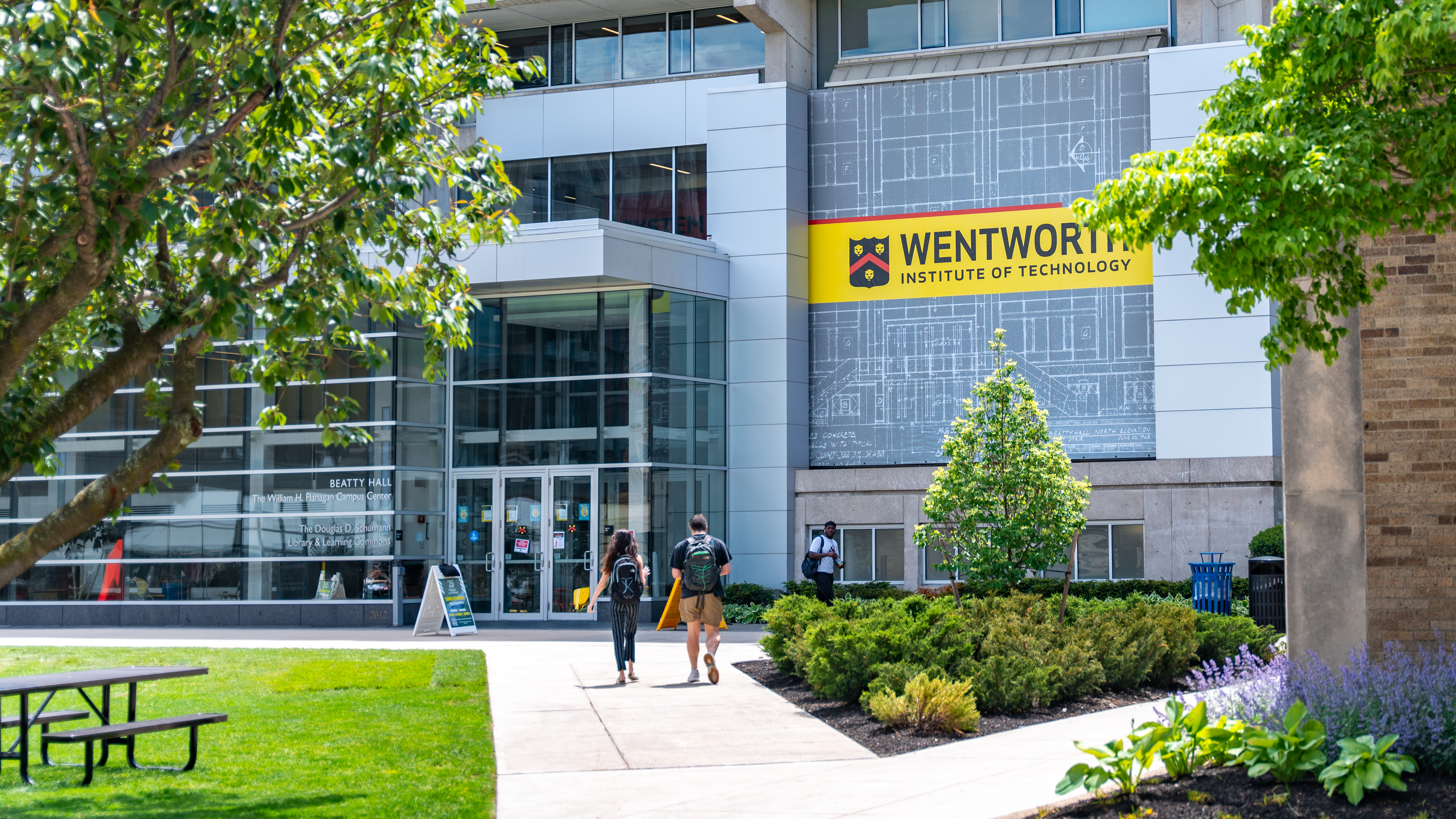
Beatty Hall

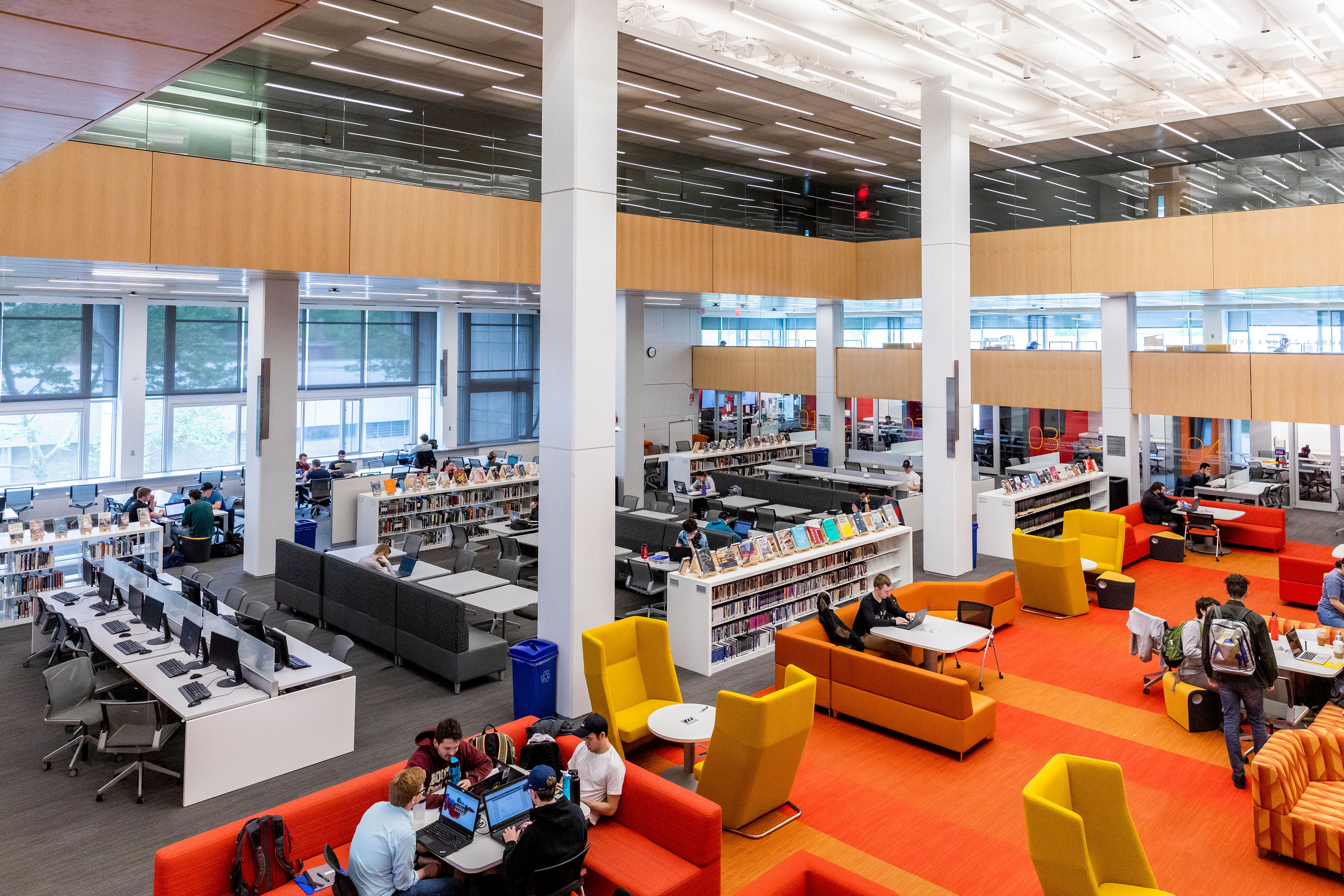
Douglas D. Schumann Library

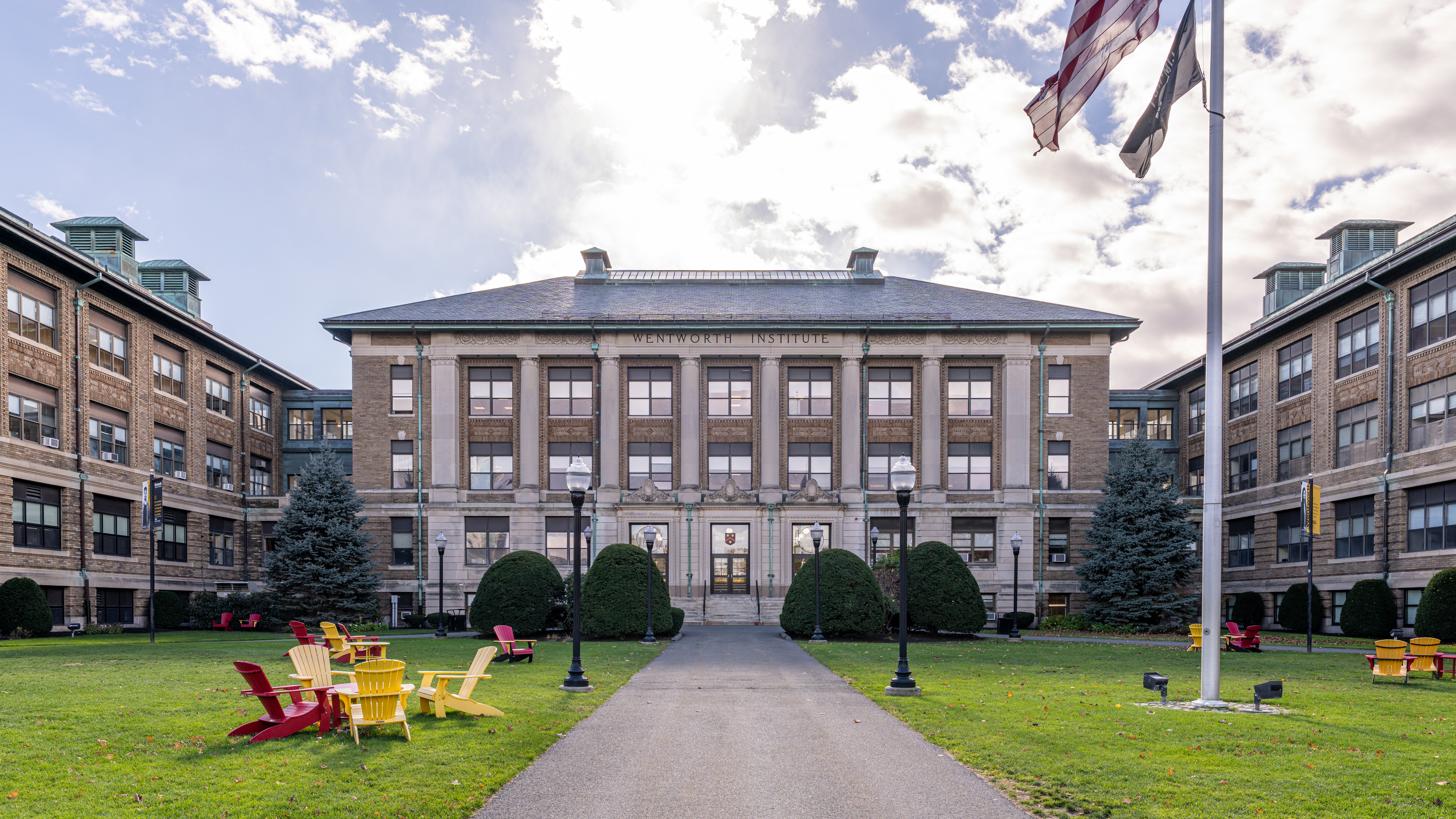
Wentworth Hall

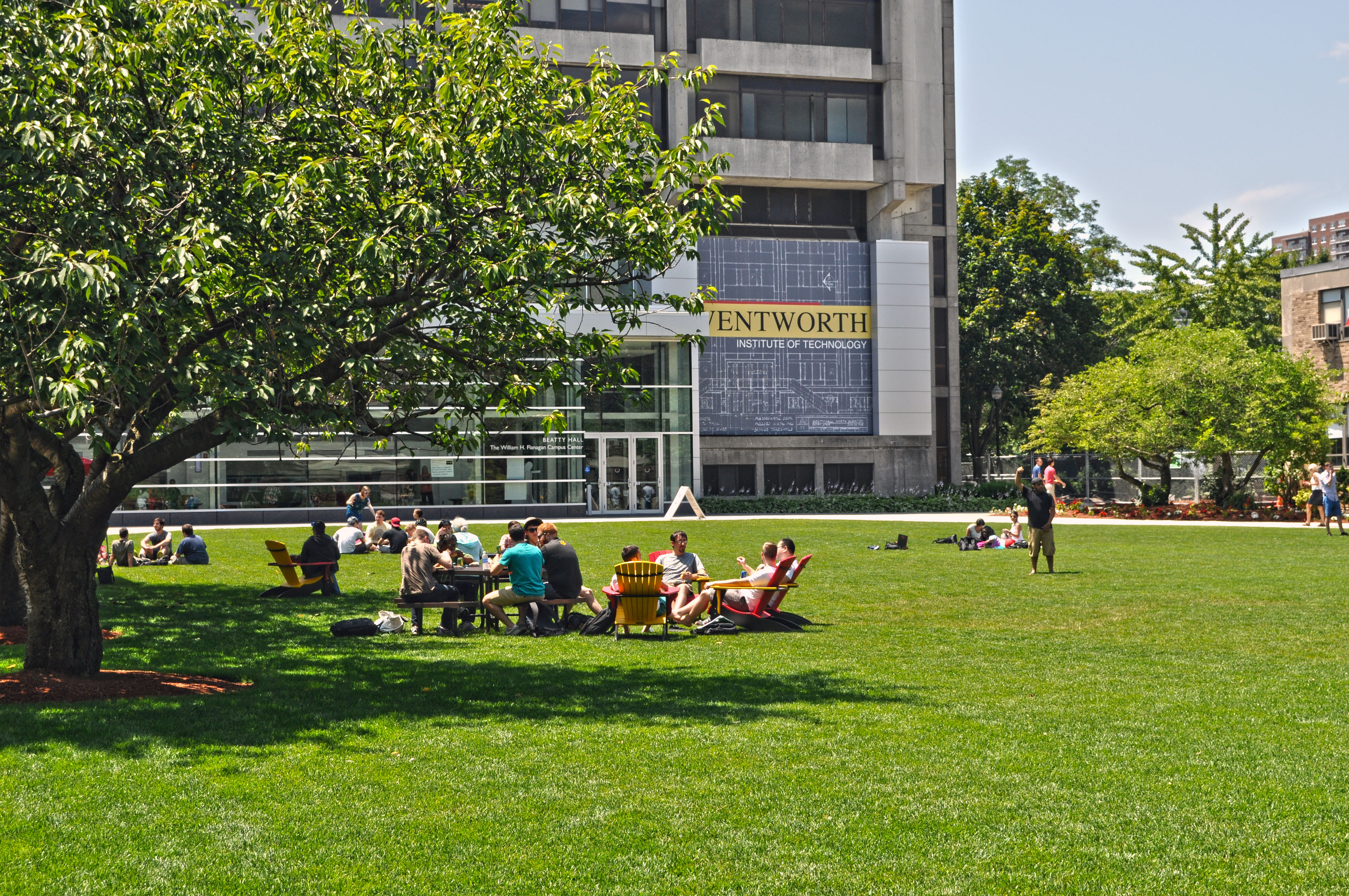
Wentworth's Quad

== Student life ==
=== Enrollment ===
Total enrollment (2025): 4,018 total (3,813 undergraduate and 205 graduate students)

- Men: 74.7%
- Women: 25.3%

=== Athletics ===
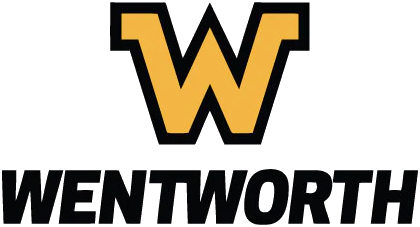
Wentworth athletics wordmark

Wentworth Institute of Technology's athletic teams are nicknamed the Leopards. Wentworth is a member of the NCAA Division III and participates in the Conference of New England as a non-football member.

In 2023, Jared M. Pierce made history at Wentworth by become the first two-time All American, in Track & Field, from the university. He finished 8th place in the shot-put at both the Indoor and Outdoor NCAA Division III National Championships.

The university has a total of ten sports programs. Men's and women's sports include basketball, cross country, lacrosse, soccer, track and field, and volleyball, while men's only sports include baseball, golf, and ice hockey. Softball is the only sport played solely by women at Wentworth.

== Notable alumni ==
- Vahe Aghabegians, technology adviser to the Armenian government
- Luther Blount (MC&TD 1937), entrepreneur, prolific inventor
- George Chamillard (IE 1958), chairman and CEO of Teradyne, Inc.
- Russell Colley (MC&TD 1918), inventor, NASA engineer, inventor of silver nylon space suit used in first crewed space flight
- John B. Kennedy, city manager, politician
- Joe Lauzon (BCOS 2006), professional mixed martial artist
- Matt LeBlanc, actor
- David Lovering (EET 1982), musician
- Stephen Lynch (CMW 1988), United States Representative from Massachusetts
- Cindy Stumpo, entrepreneur and residential contractor numerous national publications
- John A. Volpe (AC 1930), Governor of Massachusetts, United States Secretary of Transportation, namesake of the John A. Volpe National Transportation Systems Center
