= Massachusetts College of Art and Design =

Public art college in Boston, Massachusetts

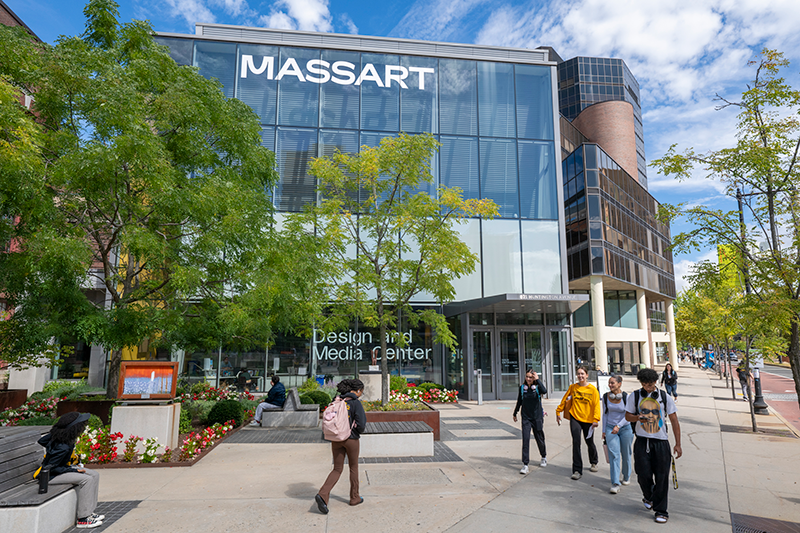
- Type: Public art school
- Established: 1873; 153 years ago
- Accreditation: NECHE
- Academic affiliations: AICAD; Colleges of the Fenway; NASAD; Professional Arts Consortium
- President: Mary K. Grant
- Faculty: 302
- Students: 1,939
- Undergraduates: 1,682
- Postgraduates: 257
- Location: Boston, Massachusetts, United States; 42.336809°N 71.099614°W
- Campus: Urban
- Nickname: MassArt
- Mascot: Mastodon
- Website: www.massart.edu
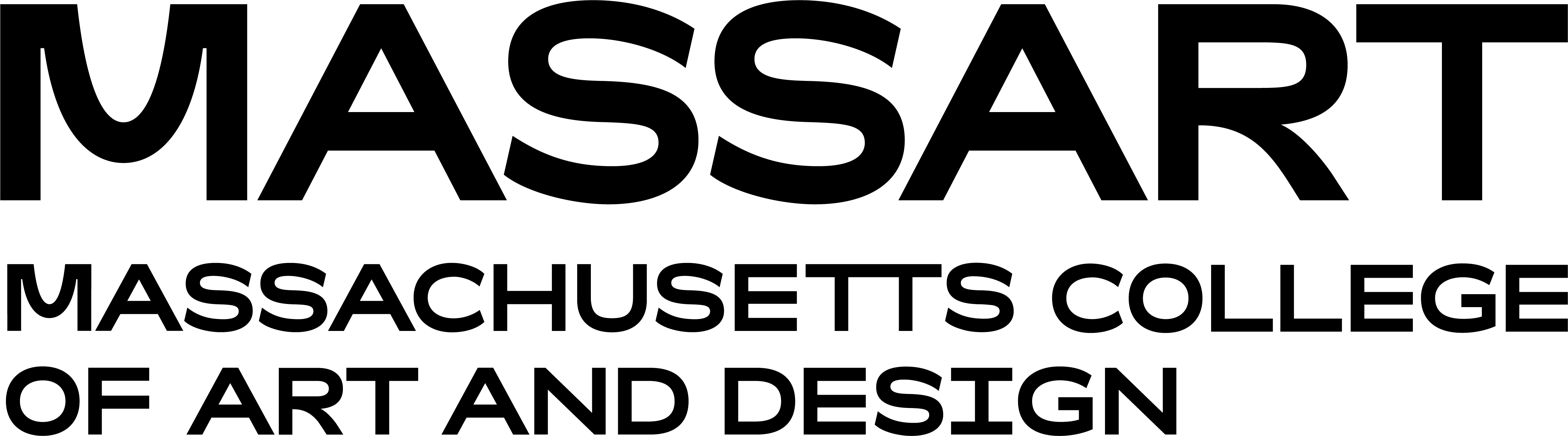

- Location within Massachusetts

Massachusetts College of Art and Design, branded as MassArt, is a public college of visual and applied art in Boston, Massachusetts. Founded in 1873, it is one of the nation's oldest art schools, and the only publicly funded independent art school in the United States. It was the first art college in the United States to grant an artistic degree.

It is a member of the Colleges of the Fenway (a resources- and facilities-sharing collegiate consortium located in the Longwood Medical and Academic Area of Boston), and the ProArts Consortium (an association of seven Boston-area colleges dedicated to the visual and performing arts).

== History ==
In the 1860s, civic and business leaders whose families had made fortunes in the China Trade, textile manufacture, railroads, and retailing, sought to influence the long-term development of Massachusetts. To stimulate learning in technology and fine art, they persuaded the state legislature to charter several institutions, including the Massachusetts Institute of Technology (1860) and the Museum of Fine Arts (1868). The third of these, founded in 1873, was the Massachusetts Normal Art School, intended to support the Massachusetts Drawing Act of 1870 by providing drawing teachers for the public schools as well as training professional artists, designers, and architects.

During the school's first decade, the state rented space for it in several locations, including Boston's Pemberton Square, School Street, and the Deacon House mansion on Washington Street. In 1886, the state built the school's first building at the corner of Exeter and Newbury streets.

In 1929 the school was moved to its second built campus at Longwood and Brookline avenues. In 1983, MassArt was relocated to the former campus of Boston State College at the corner of Longwood and Huntington avenues, after the latter school's merger with the University of Massachusetts Boston.

Boston has designated Huntington Avenue as the "Avenue of the Arts", in recognition of the location of MassArt, the Museum of Fine Arts, School of the Museum of Fine Arts at Tufts, Boston Symphony Hall, and other educational and cultural institutions along this thoroughfare.

=== Timeline ===
- 1869: Fourteen citizens petition the Massachusetts Legislature to provide drawing instruction "to all men, women, and children"
- 1870: Legislation is enacted to make drawing a required subject in Massachusetts public schools
- 1873: Legislature appropriates $7,500 to establish the Massachusetts Normal Art School
- 1876: Student work exhibited at the US Centennial Exposition is acclaimed by delegations from France, Austria, and Canada
- 1880: School relocates to the historic Deacon House and begins offering post-graduate education
- 1886: New Massachusetts Normal Art School building is constructed at the corner of Newbury and Exeter Streets
- 1901: First person of color graduates from school
- 1905: Alumnus and faculty member Albert Munsell develops what has become the world's leading color system
- 1912: Courses are added in psychology, literature, and education theory
- 1924: School becomes the first art school in the country to grant a degree, the Bachelor of Science in art education
- 1929: School is renamed Massachusetts School of Art
- 1930: Massachusetts School of Art moves to its new building at the corner of Brookline and Longwood Avenues
- 1940: Faculty member Cyrus Dallin's sculpture, Paul Revere, is installed in Boston's North End
- 1950: School grants its first Bachelor of Fine Arts degrees in design and fine arts
- 1957: First African American is appointed to the faculty: alumnus Calvin Burnett ('42)
- 1959: School is renamed Massachusetts College of Art
- 1969: Studio for Interrelated Media is founded, one of the earliest interdisciplinary college art programs in the country
- 1969: Courses in environmental design are added to the curriculum
- 1972: Master of Science degree is awarded in art education
- 1975: Master of Fine Arts degree is awarded in two- and three-dimensional fine arts
- 1981: Master of Fine Arts degree is awarded in design
- 1983: School begins to occupy and renovate the eight-building campus at the corner of Huntington and Longwood Avenues
- 1989: MassArt opens its first dormitory, christened Walter Smith Hall after school's founding principal
- 1992: MassArt completes a $14.7 million project refurbishing the Huntington Avenue campus
- 1993: "Longwood Campus" building on the corner of Brookline and Longwood Avenues, which had served as the College's main campus since 1930, is acquired by neighboring Beth Israel Deaconess Medical Center, which integrates the building into their facilities (retaining the exterior facade, but gutting and rebuilding the interior).
- 1997: Dr. Katherine H. Sloan, the first woman and tenth president of MassArt, is inaugurated
- 2000: Dynamic Media Institute is founded, a Master of Fine Arts program focused on new uses of media in communication design
- 2002: Artists' Residence opens, guaranteeing housing for all first-year students
- 2003: Legislature approves the New Partnership with the Commonwealth, which is a new model for its state funding
- 2007: Massachusetts Board of Higher Education approves the college's proposal to offer a Master of Architecture
- 2007: Governor Deval Patrick signs legislation changing the college's official name to Massachusetts College of Art and Design
- 2012: Dawn Barrett, the eleventh president of MassArt, is inaugurated.
- 2014: Kurt T. Steinberg named Acting President.
- 2016: The Design and Media Center, designed by Ennead Architects, a three-story glass facade at 621 Huntington Avenue, prominently positioned on Boston's Avenue of the Arts contains 40,000 square feet (3,700 m^{2}) of new space for the College.
- 2016: The Design Innovation program is founded with the launch of the Master of Design, Innovation
- 2017: David P. Nelson, the twelfth president of MassArt, is inaugurated.
- 2020: Nelson steps down as president and Kymberly Pinder becomes acting president.
- 2021: Mary K. Grant was named thirteenth president of MassArt.

== Academics ==
The Massachusetts College of Art of Design is accredited by the New England Commission of Higher Education. MassArt offers a bachelor's degree in Fine Arts, a Master of Teaching in Art Education, a Master of Fine Arts, a Master of Architecture (Track I & Track II - Pre-Professional-Professional), and a Master of Design Innovation, and is accredited by the National Architectural Accrediting Board (NAAB). MassArt also offers a number of pre-college (both credit and non-credit) programs for high school students, and continuing education and certificate programs for professional and non-professional artists. In addition, MassArt still fulfills its original mission, with ongoing programs for primary and secondary school teachers of art.

MassArt's undergraduate curriculum includes a Foundation Program for the first year, which provides compulsory exposure to the basics of 2D and 3D art and design. Graduation requirements include an elective studio and multiple Critical Studies courses.

Approximately 30% of MassArt's student body is Asian, African American, Hispanic/Latino, Native American, or multiracial.

== Traditions and celebrations ==
The "MassArt Iron Corps" hosts an "Iron Pour" event at MassArt approximately four times a year. The event is centered around a pouring of white-hot molten iron into molds for sculpture. In the past, this was celebrated by accompanying music, dance, and other performances. However, around 2010, the Boston Fire Department insisted on greatly reducing the number of people present, because of safety concerns. The pours are still claimed to consume around 10,000 pounds (4,500 kg) of iron per year.

The 2D Fine Arts department hosts an annual Master Print Series, where MassArt invites a visiting artist to work collaboratively with the students and faculty of the printmaking department to produce professional-level editions for the artist.

The MassArt Auction, a ticketed event hosted by Institutional Advancement, is held in April, and features major artworks that are sold to directly benefit student scholarships.

== MassArt Art Museum ==
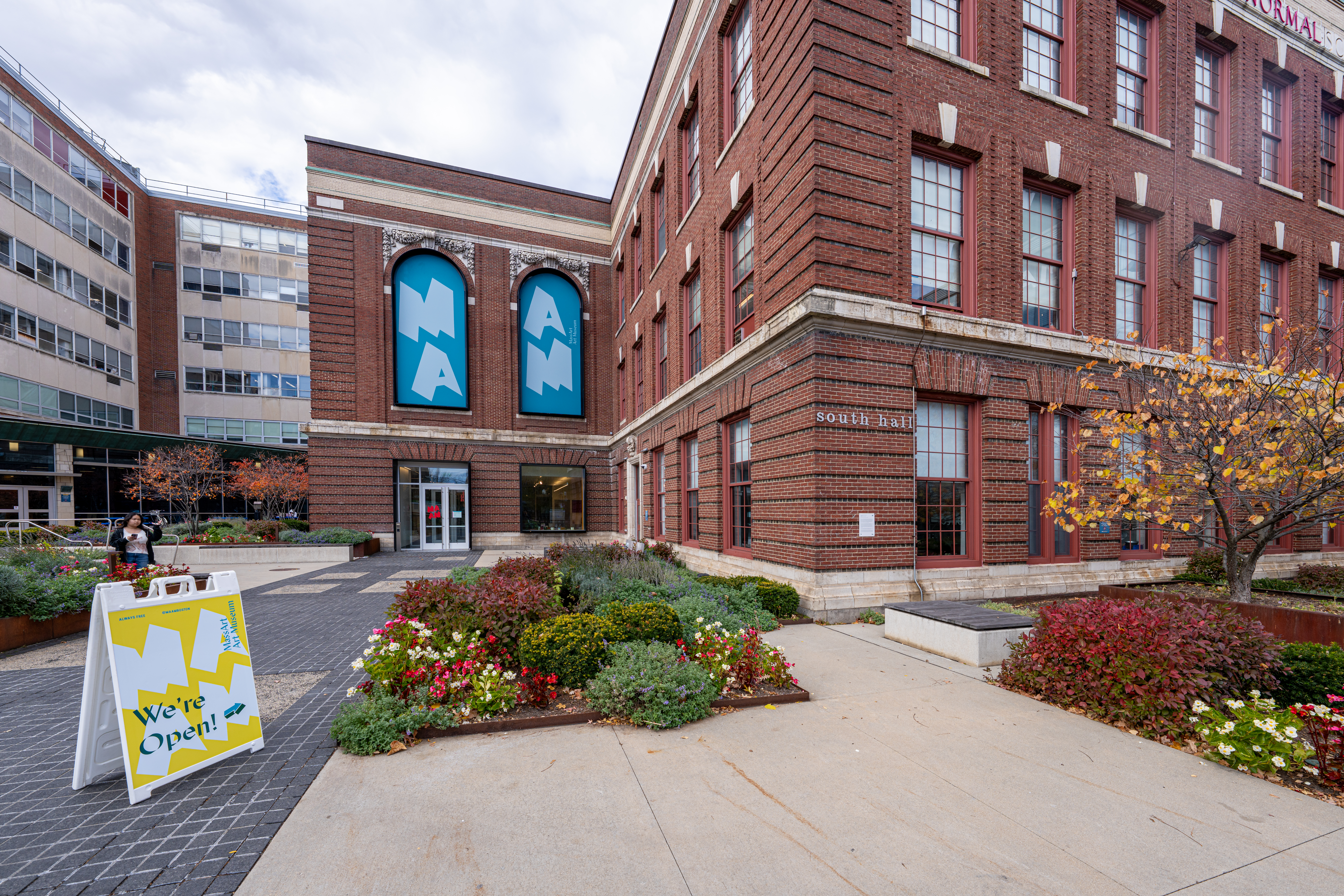
(2025)

The MassArt Art Museum (MAAM) is a free contemporary art museum which opened in February 2020 on MassArt's campus. Previously known as the Bakalar and Paine Galleries, the space reopened after extensive renovations, with a new name, branding, and an expanded mission. The renovation was supported by MassArt's "Unbound" capital campaign, which raised $12.5 million to fund the project.

The entrance to MAAM is in a building to the immediate left of the new public entrance to MassArt buildings, which is located in the Design and Media Center building.

== Campus ==
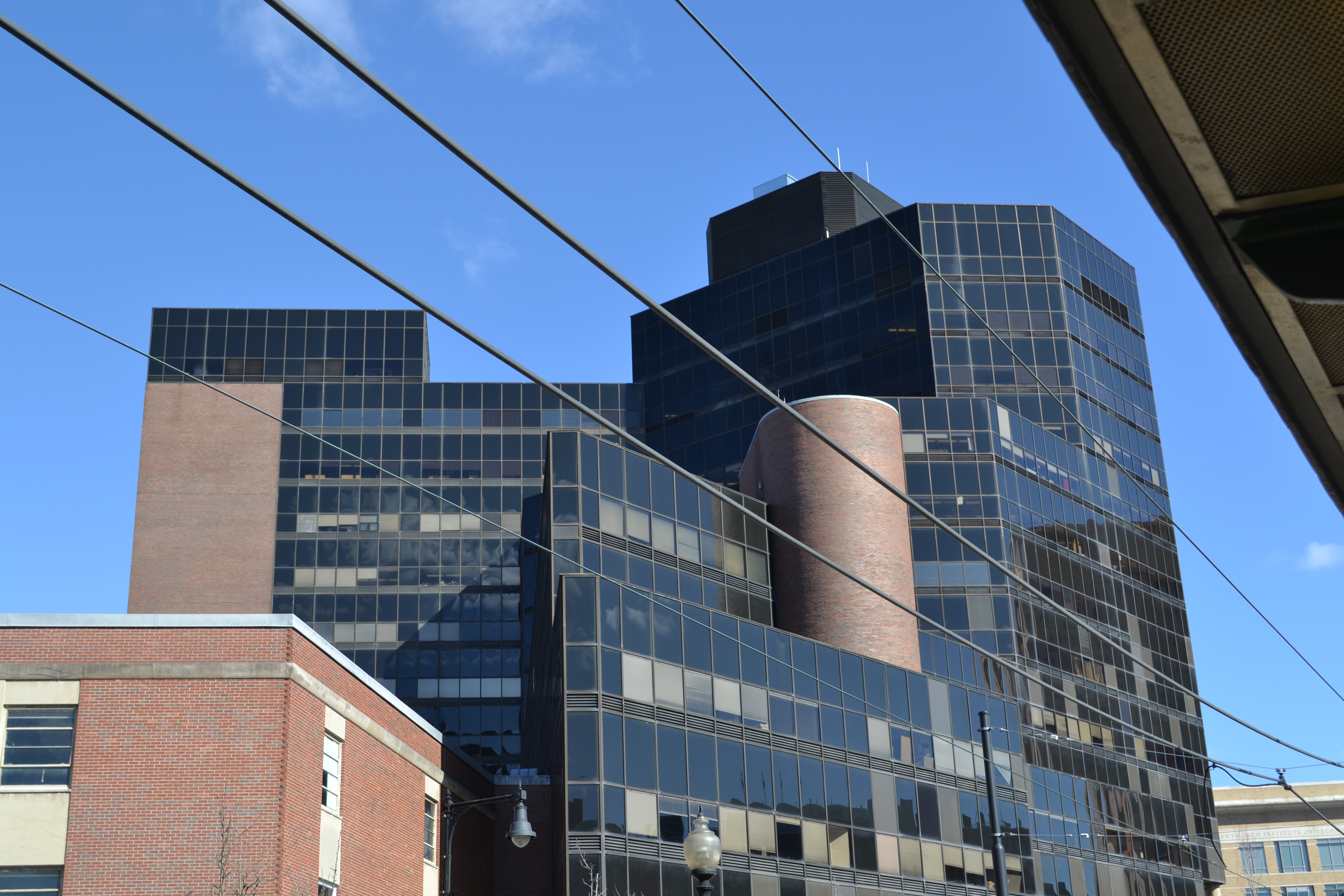
One of MassArt's primary spaces is the Tower Building. The red brick building at the lower left has since been transformed into the new Design and Media Center, which is the public entrance to the main campus complex.

Undergraduate demographics as of Fall 2023
Race and ethnicity	Total
White	55%
Hispanic	14%
Unknown	11%
Asian	7%
Two or more races	5%
Black	4%
International student	4%
Economic diversity
Low-income (Note: The percentage of students who received an income-based federal Pell grant intended for low-income students.)	28%
Affluent (Note: The percentage of students who are a part of the American middle class at the bare minimum.)	72%

MassArt is headquartered at 621 Huntington Avenue in Boston, Massachusetts, and occupies a trapezoidal block of old and new buildings it has acquired over the last two decades. Most of its academic buildings were the former campus of Boston State College, acquired after BSC was merged with the University of Massachusetts-Boston.

MassArt is located on Huntington Avenue, which has been designated and signed as "The Avenue of the Arts" in Boston. The campus is also adjacent to the Longwood Medical Area, and its immediate neighbors on Longwood Avenue include Harvard Medical School and Massachusetts College of Pharmacy and Health Sciences. Nearby neighbors along Huntington Avenue include the Isabella Stewart Gardner Museum (ISGM), the Museum of Fine Arts, the School of the Museum of Fine Arts (SMFA), and the Wentworth Institute of Technology. Further along "The Avenue of the Arts" are Northeastern University, the Huntington Theatre Company, Boston Symphony Hall, Horticultural Hall, and the New England Conservatory of Music.

Previously, MassArt had occupied a number of buildings scattered throughout Boston's Fenway-Kenmore and Longwood neighborhoods, with its main campus located on the corner of Brookline and Longwood avenues. In the mid-1990s, that building was acquired by Beth Israel Deaconess Medical Center, which gutted and rebuilt the building's interior, but kept the distinctive facade intact.

In 2009, the Campus Center (located in the Kennedy building, at the corner of Huntington and Longwood avenues) was renovated, with additions of a new, two-story glass facade on Longwood Avenue, food services, and the college bookstore. The lower level includes ReStore, a student-run freecycling space to accept and redistribute surplus art supplies, materials, tools, equipment, and publications free of charge.

In 2016, the building formerly housing a gymnasium was completely gutted and renovated as a new Design and Media Center, including facilities for the Studio for Interrelated Media program. In addition, the new building provides a spacious formal entrance into the academic campus, and new gallery space. This major project was described on the MassArt website, and included a live construction webcam feed.

=== Transportation ===
The MassArt campus is served by the MBTA Longwood Medical Area stop on the Green Line E branch, at the corner of Huntington and Longwood Avenues (next to the Campus Center). This location is also a stop on the MBTA #39 and CT2 bus routes. Other nearby public transit options are described online.

Parking spaces are extremely scarce near the MassArt campus, especially during the day. A limited number of paid spaces for students and staff are allocated by a formal application process. Visitors may use metered and commercial parking in the area.

=== Maps ===
The MassArt academic campus is compact, consisting of a number of interconnected buildings constructed and renovated over a span of several decades. Different floor heights in adjacent buildings are accommodated by a mix of stairs, ramps, and elevators, resulting in a complex internal layout that can disorient visitors. An official map is available on campus and online, showing most points of interest, including seven art gallery spaces open to the public. The map also shows elevators, wheelchair lifts, and accessible routes through and interconnecting the various buildings.

=== Academic buildings ===
The MassArt academic campus is composed of six interconnected buildings: Kennedy, South, Collins, North, East, and Tower. There is also an enclosed courtyard located in the center of the quadrangle formed by South, Collins, North, and East. The academic campus flagship is the 13-story Tower Building, wrapped in a dark glass facade, with prominent entry/lobby spaces along Huntington Ave. The Morton R. Godine Library occupies the top two floors of the Tower Building, and the President's Office is on the 11th floor. There is an auditorium in the low-rise section of the Tower Building.

The new Design and Media Center building serves as the formal main portal into the academic campus, featuring a large, spacious entry lobby that can accommodate very large temporary art installations and exhibits. Contemporary media laboratories, classrooms, meeting spaces, project and installation spaces, and galleries are also located here. There is a permanent graphic timeline history of MassArt and its predecessor schools alongside a long ramp at the side of the entry lobby, highlighting and illustrating the accomplishments of faculty, staff, and students over the years.

=== Art galleries ===
There are at least seven galleries on campus available for student shows and exhibitions. These include the Arnheim, Brant, Doran, Godine Family, Frances Euphemia Thompson, and Student Life galleries. The Pozen Center, an area built specifically to house larger scale events and performances, is located on the ground floor of the North Building. The Design and Media Center features a spacious entry lobby space used for large temporary installations, as well as additional smaller gallery spaces.

In addition, artworks in all media are informally displayed throughout the campus, in hallways, stairwells, ramps, outdoor spaces, and classrooms. Students can (and do) install artwork almost anywhere, subject to a safety review.

=== Residence halls ===
The campus includes three student residence halls, all located directly across "The Avenue of the Arts" from the MassArt academic campus: "Treehouse" (578 Huntington Ave.), Smith Hall (640 Huntington Ave.), and "The Artists' Residence" (600R Huntington Ave.). All residences feature 24/7 professional security, telephone/cable/data connectivity, and partial or full Meal Plans. Each residence hall has its own live-in Residence Hall Director and trained student Resident Assistants.

Smith Hall houses only first-year students admitted to the Foundation Program at MassArt, in suite-style living spaces of 3 to 5 students. It is a renovated 5-story apartment building located immediately across the street from MassArt's Kennedy building. In addition to student rooms, there are studio workrooms and quiet rooms on each floor.

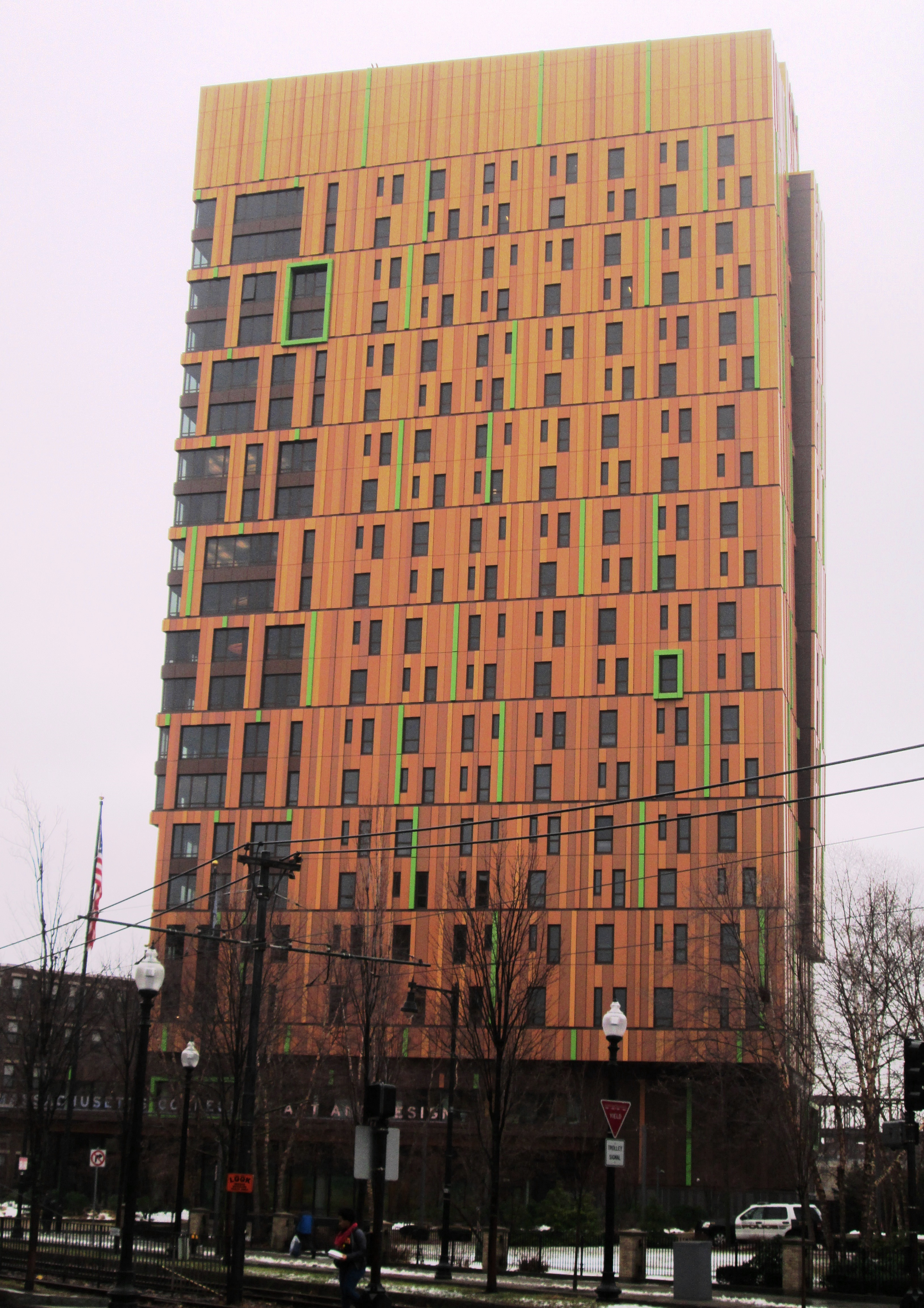
The Treehouse in 2018

The Artists' Residence ("The Rez") houses freshmen, upperclassmen, and graduate student artists. It is a 9-story structure located across the street from the MassArt Tower Building. The Artists' Residence is the first publicly funded residence hall in the United States designed specifically to house art students, and it includes studio spaces and a spray room on the top floor.

The Treehouse is a colorful 21-story dormitory tower located next to The Artists' Residence. It was designed by the firm ADD Inc. (Boston) with extensive collaboration from MassArt students, plus two other member colleges of the Colleges of the Fenway consortium. The external appearance of the building was inspired by Gustav Klimt's painting The Tree of Life.

The Treehouse mostly accommodates first-year and sophomore students in suite-style layouts in single, double, and triple bedrooms, with suite-shared bathrooms. The second floor is a Student Health Center, shared by students of MassArt, Wentworth Institute of Technology, and MCPHS University. The third floor is called the "Pajama Floor", and includes a game room/TV lounge, group study room, laundry room, fitness room, vending area, and a community kitchen.

=== Other facilities ===
MassArt students have access to common facilities typically found at many colleges, including a full-scale cafeteria, small café, school store, freecycling store, library, student center, health center, counseling center, auditorium, computer labs, and fitness center. Additional not-so-usual facilities include a working letterpress lab with an archival collection of over 500 wood and metal type fonts, 10 art galleries, studio spaces, spray booth, woodworking shop, digital maker's studio, sound studio, glass studio and performance spaces.

The Colleges of the Fenway consortium gives MassArt students additional shared access to facilities of five other nearby schools, including their library, athletics, and theatrical resources. MassArt students (with ID) also have free admission to the Museum of Fine Arts, Boston; Isabella Stewart Gardner Museum; Institute of Contemporary Art, Boston; and the Danforth Museum of Art; the ISGM is across the street, and the MFA is a short walking distance from campus.

== Notable alumni ==
- Clint Baclawski (artist and photographer)
- Harris Barron (founder, Studio for Interrelated Media & ZONE Visual Theater)
- Terry Batt (sculptor)
- Chris Beatrice (game designer)
- Claire Beckett (photographer)
- David Berger (artist)
- Henry Botkin (painter)
- Calvin Burnett (artist)
- Edith F. Butler (illustrator)
- Sharon Butler (painter, publisher of Two Coats of Paint)
- Wilhelmina Dranga Campbell (art educator, magazine editor)
- Cicely Carew (mixed-media artist)
- Jacqueline Casey (influential graphic designer at MIT)
- Mark Cesark (sculptor)
- Nicole Chesney (artist)
- Harold F. Clayton (sculptor)
- Brian Collins (designer, educator and founder of COLLINS)
- Muriel Cooper (graphic designer, MIT Media Lab co-founder)
- Robert H. Cumming (painter)
- Janet Doub Erickson (artist who founded the Blockhouse of Boston)
- Jess T. Dugan (photographer)
- Sam Durant (installation artist and sculptor)
- Ben Edlund (creator of The Tick)
- Ed Emberley (artist and illustrator)
- Aubri Esters (activist and interrelated media artist)
- Royal B. Farnum (former Head of Art Education for Massachusetts)
- Rashin Fahandej (new media artist)
- Christopher Forgues (musician and artist)
- Debra Granik (filmmaker)
- Nancy Haigh (Oscar-winning set designer)
- Hal Hartley (filmmaker)
- Charlie Hides (drag queen and comedian)
- David Hilliard (photographer)
- Elizabeth Hamilton Huntington (20th-century American painter)
- Neil Jenney (painter)
- Ben Jones (American cartoonist) (co-founder of Paper Rad, animator)
- MaPo Kinnord (ceramic artist and sculptor)
- Christian Marclay (artist)
- Poli Marichal (artist)
- Brian McCook (artist and drag performer known as Katya Zamolodchikova)
- Corrina Sephora Mensoff (artist)
- Tony Millionaire (artist, creator of the comic strip Maakies)
- Albert Henry Munsell (inventor of the Munsell Color System)
- Richard Phillips (painter)
- Jack Pierson (photographer)
- Walter Piston (classical composer)
- Nigel Poor (photographer and podcaster)
- Luther Price (filmmaker)
- John Raimondi (sculptor)
- Rashid Rana (artist)
- Sonya Rapoport (conceptual and multimedia artist)
- Erin M. Riley (artist)
- Vincent Schofield Wickham (editorial artist, sculptor)
- Phil Solomon (filmmaker)
- Andrew Stevovich (painter)
- Elisabeth Subrin (filmmaker)
- Frances Euphemia Thompson (early African American art educator)
- Vanna (post-hardcore band)
- Ernest William Watson (artist, illustrator and teacher)
- Kelly Wearstler (interior and graphic design)
- William Wegman (artist and photographer)
- N. C. Wyeth (artist and illustrator)

== Notable faculty (past and present) ==
- Ericka Beckman (filmmaker)
- Barbara Bosworth (photographer)
- Dawn Kramer (SIM)
- Donald Burgy (SIM)
- Muriel Cooper (graphic designer, futurist)
- Cyrus Dallin (sculptor)
- Taylor Davis (sculptor)
- Judy Dunaway (sound artist, composer)
- Barbara Grad (painter)
- Frank Gohlke (photographer)
- William Hannon (industrial design)
- Peter Wayne Lewis (painter)
- Victoria MacKenzie-Childs (ceramic artist)
- Laura McPhee (photographer)
- Abelardo Morell (photographer)
- Nicholas Nixon (photographer)
- John Raimondi (sculptor)
- Walter Smith (art educator, sculptor)
- Norman Toynton (painter)

== See also ==
- Colleges of the Fenway
