= Cremer =

Surname list

Cremer is an occupational surname with the same origin as the name Kramer. Notable people with the surname include:

- Bruno Cremer (1929–2010), French actor
- Camille Crémer (1840–1876), French general
- Christoph Cremer (born 1944), German physicist
- Cristina Cremer de Busti (born 1952), Argentine politician
- Erika Cremer (1900–1996), German physical chemist
- Esther Cremer (born 1988), German middle-distance runner
- Fritz Cremer (1906–1993), German sculptor
- Gerard de Cremere (1512–1594), Flemish cartographer
- Graeme Cremer (born 1986), Zimbabwean cricketer
- Grant Cremer (born 1978), Australian middle-distance runner
- Hermann Cremer (1834–1903), German theologian
- Jacob Jan Cremer (1827–1880), Dutch writer and painter
- Jacob Theodoor Cremer (1847–1923), Dutch businessman and politician
- Jan Cremer (born 1940), Dutch author
- Melanie Cremer (born 1970), German field hockey player
- Peter-Erich Cremer, (1911–1992), German U-boat Captain
- R. W. Ketton-Cremer (1906–1969), English biographer and historian
- Ted Cremer (1919–1980), American football player
- Thomas Cremer (born 1945), German geneticist and molecular biologist
- Tobias Cremer (born 1992), German politician
- Victoriano Crémer (1906–2009), Spanish poet and journalist
- William Randal Cremer (1828–1908), English Member of Parliament and pacifist

Cremers

- Armin B. Cremers (born 1946), German mathematician and computer scientist
- Cas Cremers (born 1974), Dutch computer scientist
- Coos Cremers (1806–1882), Dutch politician
- Eppo Cremers (1823–1896), Dutch Minister of Foreign Affairs and Speaker of the House
- Jan Cremers (born 1952), Dutch politician and sociologist
- Ruud Cremers (born 1992), Dutch cyclist
- Vittoria Cremers (1859–?), Italian Theosophist

De Cremer

- David De Cremer (born 1972), Belgian psychologist

== See also ==
- Cremer & Wolffenstein, architecture firm
- Kramer (surname)
- Creamer
