= Creamer =

Creamer may refer to:

- Creamer (vessel), a small pitcher or jug designed for holding cream or milk
- Creamer potato, a subtype of potato cultivar
- Non-dairy creamer, a cream substitute used with coffee or tea
- "Creamer (Radio is Dead)", a song by Limp Bizkit on their 2003 album Results May Vary
- "Non-Dairy Creamer", a single by Third Eye Blind from the EP Red Star
- USS Creamer (DE-308), a United States Navy destroyer escort launched in 1944 but never completed

== People ==
- Chris Creamer, Canadian website owner of SportsLogos.net
- David S. Creamer (1858–1946) was an Ohio politician. He was state treasurer from 1909 to 1913 and state fire marshal
- George Creamer (1855–1886), American Major League Baseball second baseman from Philadelphia, Pennsylvania
- Henry Creamer (1879–1930), American popular song lyricist, and part of the songwriting team of Creamer & Layton
- John Creamer (born ?), an international disc jockey; see John Creamer & Stephane K
- Lucy Creamer (born 1971), Champion rock climber
- Marvin Creamer (1916–2020), former college professor and amateur American sailor noted for having sailed around the globe without the aid of navigational instruments
- Matthew Creamer (born ?), award-winning American journalist who reports on marketing, advertising, media, and pop culture and is an editor-at-large at Advertising Age magazine
- Molly Creamer (born 1981), American former basketball player
- Patrick D. Creamer (1892–1949), American politician
- Paula Creamer (born 1986), American golfer
- Peter Creamer (born 1953), English former professional footballer who played as a defender
- Pierre Creamer (born 1944), former Canadian ice hockey coach
- Robert Creamer (1922–2012), American journalist and author
- Robert Creamer (political consultant) (born 1947), American political consultant
- Sandra Creamer (born 1961) Australian lawyer and Indigenous peoples' rights advocate
- Thomas J. Creamer (1843–1914), American politician
- Timothy Creamer (born 1959), NASA astronaut and a Colonel in the United States Army
- William W. Creamer (1916–1942), United States Navy officer and Navy Cross recipient

== See also ==
- Cream (disambiguation)
