= Vertico spatially modulated illumination =

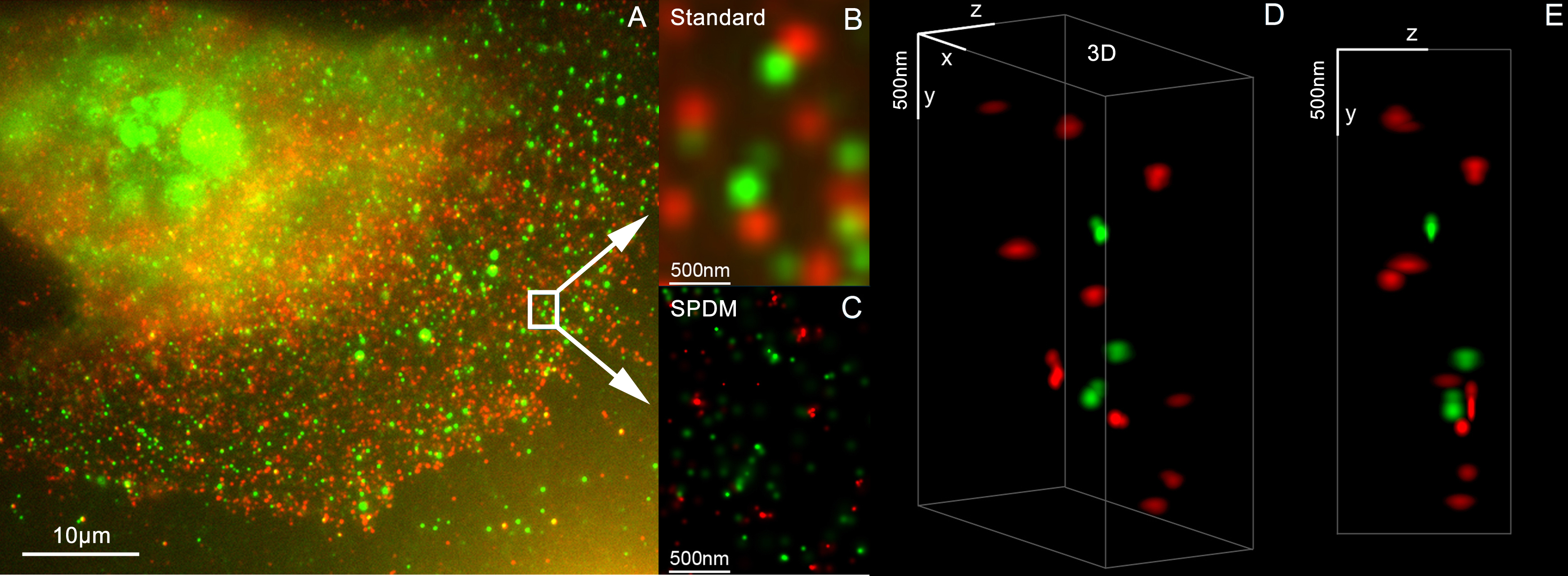
3D dual colour super resolution microscopy with Her2 and Her3 in breast cancer cells, standard dyes: Alexa 488, Alexa 568 - LIMON (SPDM +SMI

Vertico spatially modulated illumination (Vertico-SMI) is the fastest light microscope for the 3D analysis of complete cells in the nanometer range. It is based on two technologies developed in 1996, SMI (spatially modulated illumination) and SPDM (spectral precision distance microscopy). The effective optical resolution of this optical nanoscope has reached the vicinity of 5 nm in 2D and 40 nm in 3D, greatly surpassing the λ/2 resolution limit (about 200 nm for blue light) applying to standard microscopy using transmission or reflection of natural light (as opposed to structured illumination or fluorescence) according to the Abbe resolution limit That limit (also known as the Rayleigh limit) had been determined by Ernst Abbe in 1873 and governs the achievable resolution limit of microscopes using conventional techniques.

The Vertico-SMI microscope was developed by a team led by Christoph Cremer, emeritus at Heidelberg University, and is based on the combination of light optical techniques of localization microscopy (SPDM, spectral precision distance microscopy) and structured illumination (SMI, spatially modulated illumination).

Since March 2008 many standard fluorescent dyes like GFP and Alexa fluorescent dyes can be used with this so-called SPDMphymod (physically modifiable fluorophores) localization microscopy, for which only one single laser wavelength of suitable intensity is sufficient for nanoimaging.

== Configuration ==
SMI stands for a special type of laser optical illumination (spatially modulated illumination), and Vertico reflects the vertical arrangement of the microscope axis, which renders possible the analysis of fixed cells but also of living cells with an optical resolution below 10 nanometers (1 nanometer = 1 nm = 1 × 10^{−9} m).

A particularity of this technology, compared with focusing techniques, such as 4Pi microscopy is the wide field exposures which allow entire cells to be depicted at the nano scale. Such a 3D exposure of a whole cell with a typical object size of 20 µm × 20 µm requires only 2 minutes. Wide field exposures signify that the entire object is illuminated and detected simultaneously.

== Spatially modulated illumination ==
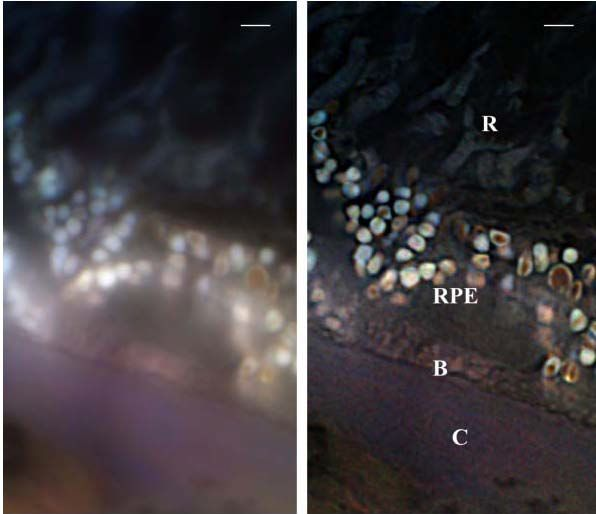
SMI + TIRF of human eye tissue affected by macular degeneration

SMI microscopy is a light optical process of the so-called point spread function-engineering. These are processes which modify the point spread function (PSF) of a microscope in a suitable manner to either increase the optical resolution, to maximize the precision of distance measurements of fluorescent objects that are small relative to the wavelength of the illuminating light, or to extract other structural parameters in the nanometer range.

The SMI microscope being developed at the Kirchhoff Institute for Physics at Heidelberg University achieves this in the following manner: The illumination intensity within the object range is not uniform, unlike conventional wide field fluorescence microscopes, but is spatially modulated in a precise manner by the use of two opposing interfering laser beams along the axis. The principle of the spatially modulated wave field was developed in 1993 by Bailey et al. The SMI microscopy approach used in the Heidelberg application moves the object in high-precision steps through the wave field, or the wave field itself is moved relative to the object by phase shift. This results in an improved axial size and distance resolution.

SMI can be combined with other super resolution technologies, for instance with 3D LIMON or LSI-TIRF as a total internal reflection interferometer with laterally structured illumination. This SMI technique allowed to acquire light-optical images of autofluorophore distributions in the sections from human eye tissue with previously unmatched optical resolution. Use of three different excitation wavelengths (488, 568 and 647 nm), enables to gather spectral information about the autofluorescence signal. This has been used for of human eye tissue affected by macular degeneration AMD.

== SPDM: localization microscopy ==
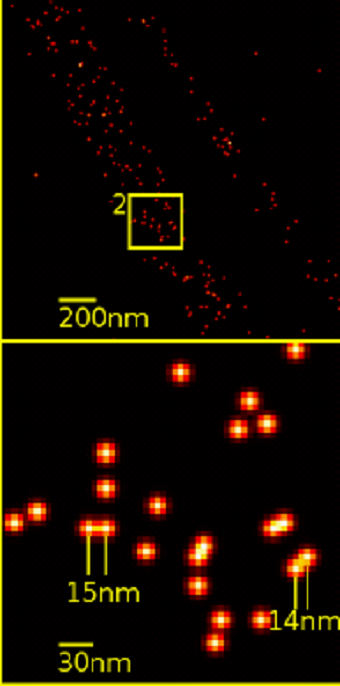
Single YFP molecule super resolution microscopy / SPDMphymod

A single, tiny source of light can be located much better than the resolution of a microscope: Although the light will produce a blurry spot, computer algorithms can be used to accurately calculate the center of the blurry spot, taking into account the point spread function of the microscope, the noise properties of the detector, and so on. However, this approach does not work when there are too many sources close to each other: The sources all blur together.

SPDM (spectral precision distance microscopy) is a family of techniques in fluorescence microscopy which gets around this problem by measuring just a few sources at a time, so that each source is "optically isolated" from the others (i.e., separated by more than the microscope's resolution, typically ~200-250 nm). Then, the above technique (finding the center of each blurry spot) can be used.

If the molecules have a variety of different spectra (absorption spectra and/or emission spectra), then it is possible to look at light from just a few molecules at a time by using the appropriate light sources and filters. Molecules can also be distinguished in more subtle ways based on fluorescent lifetime and other techniques.

The structural resolution achievable using SPDM can be expressed in terms of the smallest measurable distance between two in their spatial position determined punctiform particle of different spectral characteristics ("topological resolution"). Modeling has shown that under suitable conditions regarding the precision of localization, particle density etc., the "topological resolution" corresponds to a "space frequency" which in terms of the classical definition is equivalent to a much improved optical resolution.

SPDM is a localization microscopy which achieves an effective optical resolution several times better than the conventional optical resolution (approx. 200-250 nm), represented by the half-width of the main maximum of the effective point image function. By applying suitable laser optical precision processes, position and distances significantly smaller than the half-width of the point spread function (conventionally 200–250 nm) can be measured with nanometer accuracy between targets with different spectral signatures. An important area of application is genome research (study of the functional organization of the genome). Another important area of use is research into the structure of membranes.

One of the most important basics of the localization microscopy in general is the first experimental work for the localization of fluorescent objects in the nanoscale (3D) in 1996 and theoretical and experimental proof for a localization accuracy using visible light in the range of 1 nm – the basis for localization microscopy better than 1/100 of the wavelength.

== SPDMphymod: standard fluorescent dyes in the blinking mode like GFP ==
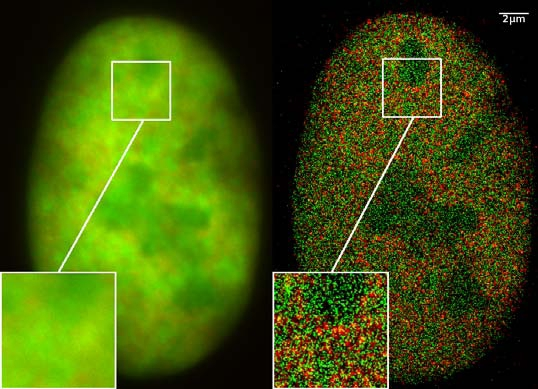
Dual color localization microscopy SPDMphymod/super resolution microscopy with GFP & RFP fusion proteins

Only in the past two years have molecules been used in nanoscopic studies which emit the same spectral light frequency (but with different spectral signatures based on the flashing characteristics) but which can be switched on and off by means of light as is necessary for spectral precision distance microscopy. By combining many thousands of images of the same cell, it was possible using laser optical precision measurements to record localization images with significantly improved optical resolution. The application of these novel nanoscopy processes appeared until recently very difficult because it was assumed that only specially manufactured molecules could be switched on and off in a suitable manner by using light.

In March 2008 Christoph Cremer’s lab discovered that this was also possible for many standard fluorescent dye like GFP, Alexa dyes and fluorescein molecules, provided certain photo-physical conditions are present. Using this so-called SPDMphymod (physically modifiable fluorophores) technology a single laser wavelength of suitable intensity is sufficient for nanoimaging. In contrast other localization microscopies need two laser wavelengths when special photo-switchable/photo-activatable fluorescence molecules are used.

The GFP gene has been introduced and expressed in many procaryotic and eucaryotic cells and the Nobel Prize in Chemistry 2008 was awarded to Martin Chalfie, Osamu Shimomura, and Roger Y. Tsien for their discovery and development of the green fluorescent protein. The finding that these standard fluorescent molecules can be used extends the applicability of the SPMD method to numerous research fields in biophysics, cell biology and medicine.

Standard fluorescent dyes already successfully used with the SPDMphymod technology: GFP, RFP, YFP, Alexa 488, Alexa 568, Alexa 647, Cy2, Cy3, Atto 488 and fluorescein.

== LIMON: 3D super resolution microscopy ==
LIMON (Light MicrOscopical nanosizing microscopy) was invented in 2001 at the University of Heidelberg and combines localization microscopy and spatially modulated illumination to the 3D super resolution microscopy.

The 3D images using Vertico-SMI are made possible by the combination of SMI and SPDM, whereby first the SMI and then the SPDM process is applied. The SMI process determines the center of particles and their spread in the direction of the microscope axis. While the center of particles/molecules can be determined with a 1–2 nm precision, the spread around this point can be determined down to an axial diameter of approx. 30-40 nm.

Subsequently, the lateral position of the individual particles/molecules is determined using SPDM, achieving a precision of a few nanometers. At present, SPDM achieves 16 frames/sec with an effective resolution of 10 nm in 2D (object plane); approximately 2000 such frames are combined with SMI data (ca. 10 sec acquisition time) to achieve a three-dimensional image of highest resolution (effective optical 3D resolution ca. 40-50 nm). With a faster camera, one can expect even higher rates (up to several hundred frames/sec, under development). Using suitable dyes, even higher effective optical 3D resolutions should be possible

By combining SPDMphymod with SMI (both invented in Christoph Cremer´s lab in 1996) a 3D dual colour reconstruction of the spatial arrangements of Her2/neu and Her3 clusters was achieved. The positions in all three directions of the protein clusters could be determined with an accuracy of about 25 nm.

== Use of super resolution microscopy in industry ==
Despite its use in biomedical labs, super resolution technologies could serve as important tools in pharmaceutical research. They could be especially helpful in the identification and valuation of targets. For example, biomolecular machines (BMM) are highly complex nanostructures consisting of several large molecules and which are responsible for basic functions in the body cells. Depending on their functional status, they have a defined 3D structure. Examples of biomolecular machines are nucleosomes which enable the DNA, a two meter long carrier of genetic information, to fold in the body cells in a space of a few millionth of a millimeter in diameter only. Therefore, the DNA can serve as an information and control center.

By using LIMON 3D in combination with LIMON complex labeling, it is possible for the first time to make hidden proteins or nucleic acids of a 3D-molecule complex of the so-called biomolecular machines visible without destroying the complex. Up to now, the problem in most cases was that the complex had to be destroyed for detailed analysis of the individual macromolecules therein. Alternatively, virtual computer simulation models or expensive nuclear magnetic resonance methods were used to visualize the three-dimensional structure of such complexes.
