= Institute of Molecular Biology =

German scientific research centre

Coordinates: 49°59′21.16″N 8°13′57.38″E

Institute of Molecular Biology (IMB)
- Established: 2010
- Focus: developmental biology, epigenetics, DNA repair, ageing
- Location: Mainz, Germany
- Website: www.imb-mainz.de

The Institute of Molecular Biology (IMB) is a modern research centre on the campus of the Johannes Gutenberg University in Mainz, Germany. It is funded by the Boehringer Ingelheim Foundation and the state of Rheinland Palatinate. The scientists at IMB primarily conduct basic science in developmental biology, epigenetics, ageing, genome stability and related areas.

== History ==
- In early 2009 the Boehringer Ingelheim Foundation decided to fund a new centre of excellence in the life sciences.
- The federal state of Rhineland-Palatinate financed the construction of a new building, starting in December 2009 on the campus of the University of Mainz.
- In May 2010 developmental biologist Christof Niehrs (formerly at the German Cancer Research Center, DKFZ) was appointed as the institute's founding director. The institute was then named "Institute of Molecular Biology" and the institute's research focus on developmental biology, epigenetics, and DNA repair was set.
- The major part of the IMB building was inaugurated in March 2011.
- In July 2011, the first five research groups started their work at IMB, with four more groups following in 2012.
- From 2013 to 2015, eight research groups joined IMB.
- From 2018 to 2021, six groups joined IMB.
- The continuation of core funding was secured from autumn 2020 – 2027 by the Boehringer Ingelheim Foundation and the State of Rhineland-Palatinate.

== Research ==
IMB's mission is to answer key questions in how organisms grow, age, and develop disease through basic research in epigenetics, genome stability and related fields.

Research in these fields is carried out in the following research groups, led by one group leader each:

- Roopesh Anand: Homology-directed DNA repair
- Peter Baumann: Chromosome Dynamics, Telomeres & Ageing
- Petra Beli: Chromatin Biology & Proteomics
- Dorothee Dormann: RNA-Binding Proteins in Neurodegeneration
- Claudia Keller Valsecchi: Biology of Gene Dosage Alterations
- René Ketting: Biology of Non-Coding RNA
- Anton Khmelinksii: Proteome Organisation & Dynamics
- Julian König: Genomic Views of the RNA World
- Nard Kubben: Biology of Ageing and Ageing-Related Diseases
- Edward Lemke: Synthetic Biophysics of Protein Disorder
- Katja Luck: Integrative Systems Biology
- Brian Luke: Telomere Biology
- Christof Niehrs: DNA Demethylation & Reprogramming
- Stamatis Papathanasiou: Functional Consequences of Errors in Mitosis
- Katharina Papsdorf: Lipid Homeostasis in Ageing & Longevity
- Jan Padeken: Heterochromatin & Genome Stability
- Vassilis Roukos: Cell Biology of Genome Maintenance
- Sandra Schick: Chromatin Regulation
- Lukas Stelzl: Gene Regulation by Liquid-Liquid Phase Separation
- Helle Ulrich: Maintenance of Genome Stability
- Siyao Wang: Transgenrational Consequences of DNA Damage
- Sina Wittmann: Protein Order in Transcription

== Joint Research Initiatives ==
IMB coordinates a number of joint research initiatives with institutions in Mainz (Johannes Gutenberg University, the University Medical Centre, and the Max Planck Institute for Polymer Research) and beyond.

Current joint Research Initiatives:

- The SFB 1361 on "Regulation of DNA Repair and Genome Stability" funded by the DFG
- The "Centre for Healthy Ageing" (CHA), a virtual research centre that brings together researchers in DNA repair, telomere biology, epigenetics, resilience, immunology and clinical specialties in the context of ageing
- The "Resilience, Adaption and Longevity" (ReALity), a joint initiative of all Principal investigators of the Faculty of Biology, the Focus Program Translational Neurosciences (FTN), the Research Center for Immunotherapy (FZI), and the Center for Translational Vascular Biology (CTVB) at Johannes Gutenberg University Mainz
- The "Science of Healthy Ageing Research Programme" (SHARP), a joint PhD programme between IMB, Johannes Gutenberg University, and the University Medical Center Mainz (UMC).
- The GenEvo Research Training Group on "Gene Regulation in Evolution"
- The Cohorts for Healthy Ageing (CoAGE), a doctoral programme which aims to understand why many diseases occur more frequently in old age and how we can age healthily
- Centre for Healthy Ageing Programme for Clinician Scientists (CHANCE) provides Clinician Scientists at the University Medical Center Mainz (UMC) with research opportunities in the Centre for Healthy Ageing (CHA) partner institutions
- The CRC 1551: Polymer Concepts in Cellular Function, a newly-established DFG-funded Collaborative Research Centre (CRC) to build an interdisciplinary think tank for polymer scientists and life scientists
- 4R: R-loop Regulation in Robustness & Resilience - A Research Training Group that aims to gain mechanistic insights regarding how RNA-based processes contribute to robustness and resilience, especially through R-loops
- IMB's International PhD Programme (IPP)
- IMB's International Summer School (ISS), an annual six-week research experience for students
- IMB's Postdoc Programme (IPPro)

In addition, IMB runs an Advanced Training Programme with short courses in soft skills.

== International PhD Programme (IPP) ==
The International PhD Program is coordinated by the Institute for Molecular Biology. The participating groups are located at the following institutions:

- Institute of Molecular Biology (IMB)
- Johannes Gutenberg University (JGU)
- University Medical Centre (UMC)

The research groups in the IPP cover a broad range of expertise in ageing & disease, DNA repair & genome stability, epigenetics & nuclear dynamics, bioinformatics & computational biology, RNA biology, and gene regulation & evolution.

Core funding for the IPP comes from the three main participating institutions of IMB, JGU, and UMC.

== International Summer School ==
The International Summer School (ISS) is a 6-week programme with a focus on "Gene Regulation, Epigenetics and Genome Stability". The ISS offers outstanding and enthusiastic undergraduate and Master's students from all over the world the opportunity to acquire excellent practical skills and hands-on training from leading scientists in molecular biology.

== Postdoc Programme ==
The IMB Postdoc Programme (IPPro) was established specifically to provide IMBs postdocs with the necessary scientific & technical support and tailored mentoring to fast-track their careers, including scientific seminars, courses & events, technical training, professional skills training, mentoring, and career development.

== Scientific Advisory Board (SAB) ==
Current members of the SAB:

- Prof. Peter Becker (Biomedical Center Munich, LMU Munich)
- Prof. Bradley Cairns (Huntsman Cancer Institute, University of Utah)
- Prof. Malene Hansen (Buck Institute for Research on Aging)
- Prof. Ian Hickson (Center for Chromosome Stability and Center for Healthy Aging, University of Copenhagen)
- Prof. Andreas Ladurner (LMU Munich)
- Prof. Ruth Lehmann (The Whitehead Institute for Biomedical Research)
- Prof. Marina Rodnina (Max Planck Institute for Biophysical Chemistry, Göttingen)

== Infrastructure ==
IMB is housed in a new 6,000 sq m research building with laboratories, offices, seminar rooms and a large auditorium. IMB is located in close proximity to many institutes of the Johannes Gutenberg University of Mainz, two Max Planck Institutes, the University of Applied Sciences Mainz, and the University Medical Center. Nearby Frankfurt and Darmstadt are also cities with extensive scientific activities, including the research of Goethe University Frankfurt, and the Technical University of Darmstadt.

== People related to the institute ==
- Christof Niehrs, Leibniz Prize awardee, founding director of IMB.
- Rudolf Jaenisch, pioneer in the field of transgenetic research, member of the Scientific Advisory Board.
- Ernst Ludwig Winnacker, renowned biochemist and research manager, previous member of the Scientific Advisory Board.
- Peter Baumann, Holder of the Humboldt Professorship and Adjunct Director at IMB, was elected to the European Molecular Biology Organization in 2019
- Christoph Cremer, German physicist, emeritus at the Ruprecht-Karls-University Heidelberg, honorary professor at the University of Mainz and emeritus Group Leader at IMB
