= Patrick D. Creamer =

American politician

Patrick D. Creamer (July 9, 1892 – March 31, 1949) was an American politician and a trainman.

Creamer was born in Saint Paul, Minnesota, and graduated from St. Michael's Parochial School. He went to University of St. Thomas and to Notre Dame Law School. He served in the United States Army during World War I. Creamer lived in Saint Paul with his wife, Edna (née Kopp, of Shakopee, Minnesota) and children, Mary Creamer Landy, Patricia Creamer Emerson, Patrick Creamer, George "Roman" Creamer, Robert Stanley Creamer, William Creamer and Kathleen Creamer Rezek. He had worked as a trainman for the Great Northern Railway. Creamer sat in the Minnesota House of Representatives from 1945 until his death in 1949.
