= Christoph Cremer =

German physicist

Christoph Cremer (born in Freiburg im Breisgau, Germany) is a German physicist and emeritus at Heidelberg University, former honorary professor at the University of Mainz and was a former group leader at Institute of Molecular Biology (IMB) at the University of Mainz, Germany, who has successfully overcome the conventional limit of resolution that applies to light based investigations (the Abbe limit) by a range of different methods (1971/1978 development of the concept of 4Pi-microscopy; 1996 localization microscopy SPDM; 1997 spatially structured illumination SIM (first developed in 1995 by John M. Guerra at Polaroid Corp.)). In the meantime, according to his own statement, Christoph Cremer is a member of the Max Planck Institute for Chemistry (Otto Hahn Institute) and the Max Planck Institute for Polymer Research.

His actual microscope Vertico-SMI is the world's fastest nano light microscope that allows large scale investigation of supramolecular complexes including living cell conditions. It allows 3 D imaging of biological preparations marked with conventional fluorescent dyes and reaches a resolution of 10 nm in 2D and 40 nm in 3D.

This nanoscope has therefore the potential to add substantially to the current revolution in optical imaging which will affect the entire molecular biology, medical and pharmaceutical research. The technology allows the development of new strategies for the prevention, the lowering of risk and therapeutic treatment of diseases.

== Biography ==
Following a few semesters studying philosophy and history at the University of Freiburg and LMU Munich, Cremer studied physics in Munich (with financial support from the Studienstiftung des Deutschen Volkes) and completed his Ph.D. in genetics and biophysics in Freiburg. This was followed by post-doctoral studies at the Institute for Human Genetics at the University of Freiburg, several years in the United States at the University of California, and his "Habilitation" in general human genetics and experimental cytogenetics at the University of Freiburg. From 1983 until his retirement, he was teaching as a professor (chair since 2004) for "applied optics and information processing" at the Kirchhoff Institute for Physics at Heidelberg University. In addition, he was a member of the Interdisciplinary Center for Scientific Computing. Cremer was a participant in three "Projects of Excellence" of Heidelberg University (2007–2012), and was also a partner in the Biotechnology Cluster for cell-based and molecular medicine, one of five clusters selected in 2008 as German BMBF Clusters of Excellence. Elected as Second Speaker of the Senate of Heidelberg University, Cremer was also involved in university governance and politics. In his function as adjunct professor at the University of Maine and as member of the Jackson Laboratory (Bar Harbor, Maine), where he undertakes research for several weeks each year during the semester breaks, he was involved in the establishment of the biophysics center (Institute for Molecular Biophysics), which is linked with Heidelberg University through a "Global Network" collaboration.

Cremer is married to architect and artist Letizia Mancino-Cremer.

Super Resolution Microscopy

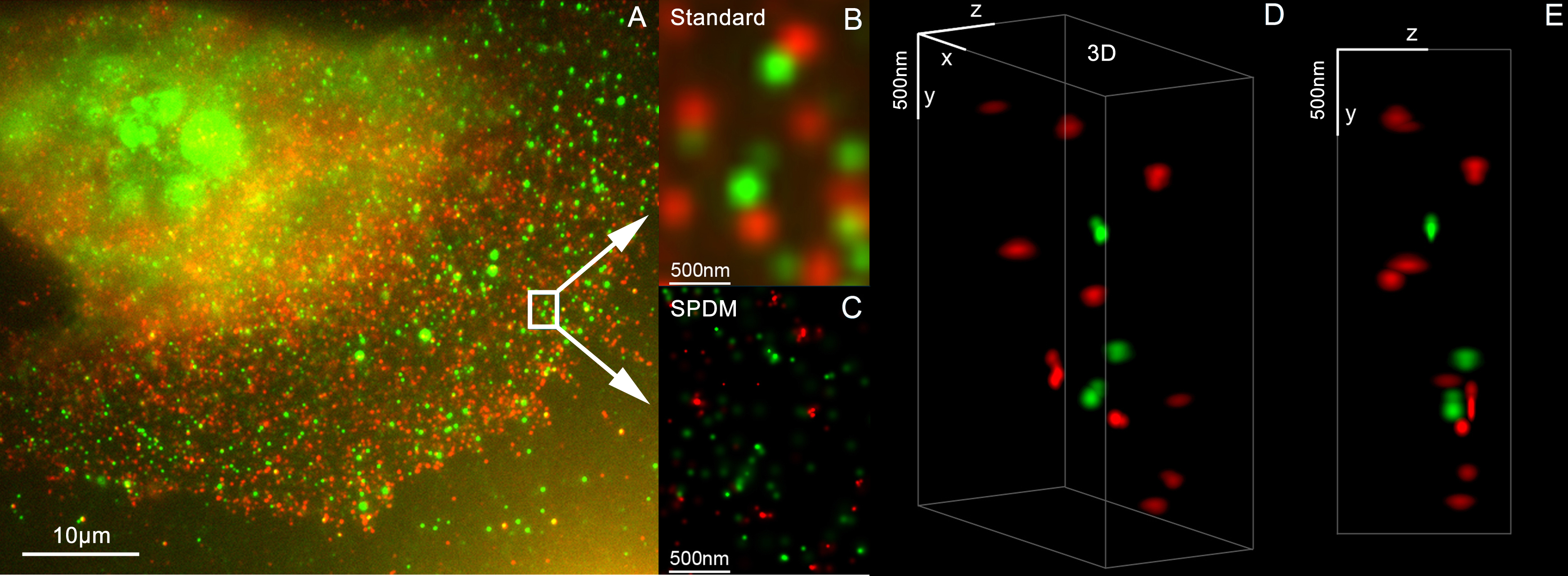
Breast Cancer Cells: 3D LIMON Dual Color Super Resolution Microscopy of Her2 and Her3 & cluster calculations

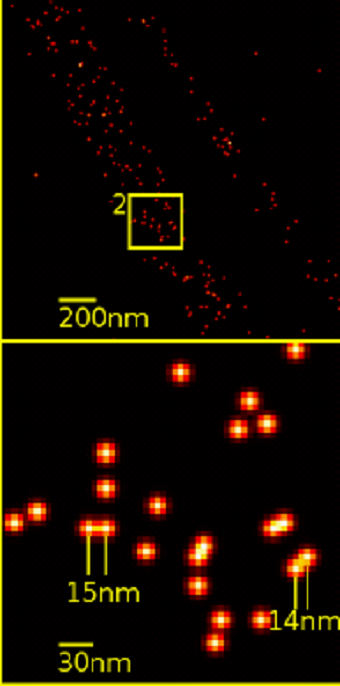
SPDMphmyod: Single YFP molecule detection in a human cancer cell

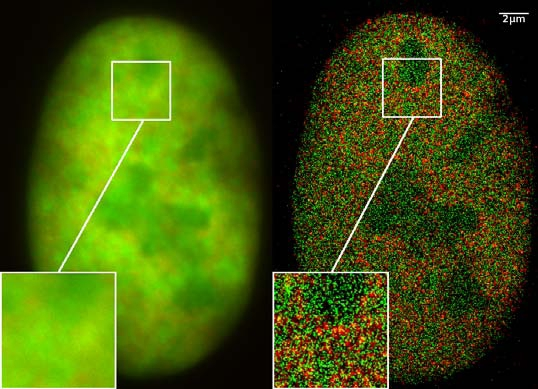
SPDMphymod Co- localisation microscopy of a nucleus: 120.000 GFP and RFP fusion proteins localized in a widefield view (470 μm^{2})

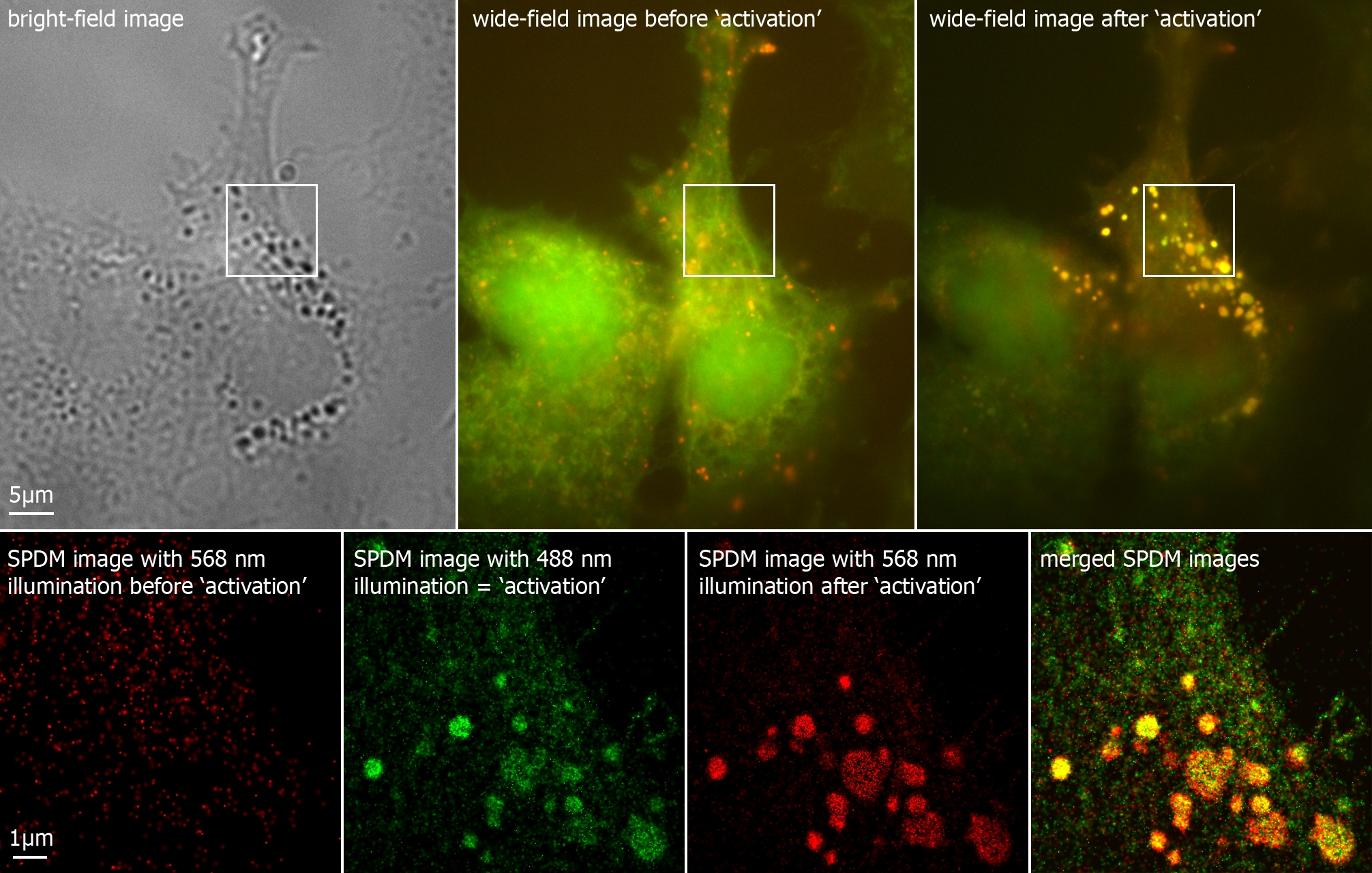
Label-free Localisation Microscopy SPDM - Super Resolution Microscopy reveals prior undetebable intracellular structures

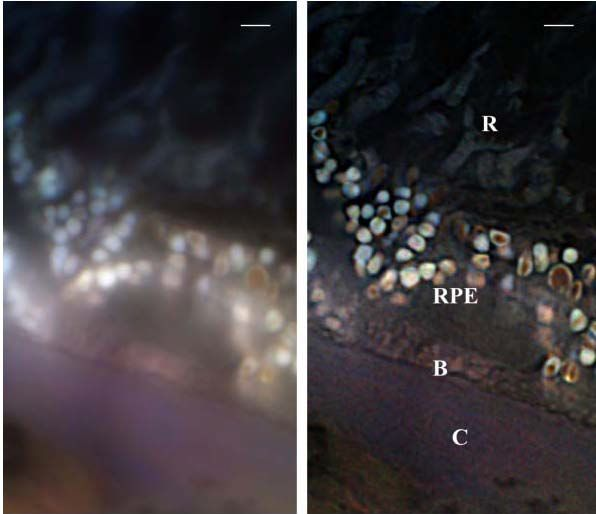
SMI Investigation of human eye tissue, affected by macular degeneration AMD

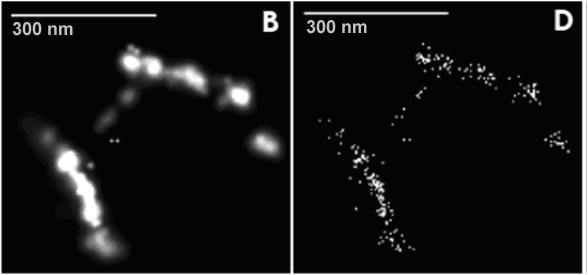
Virus Super Resolution Microscopy SPDM Cremer/Wege labs

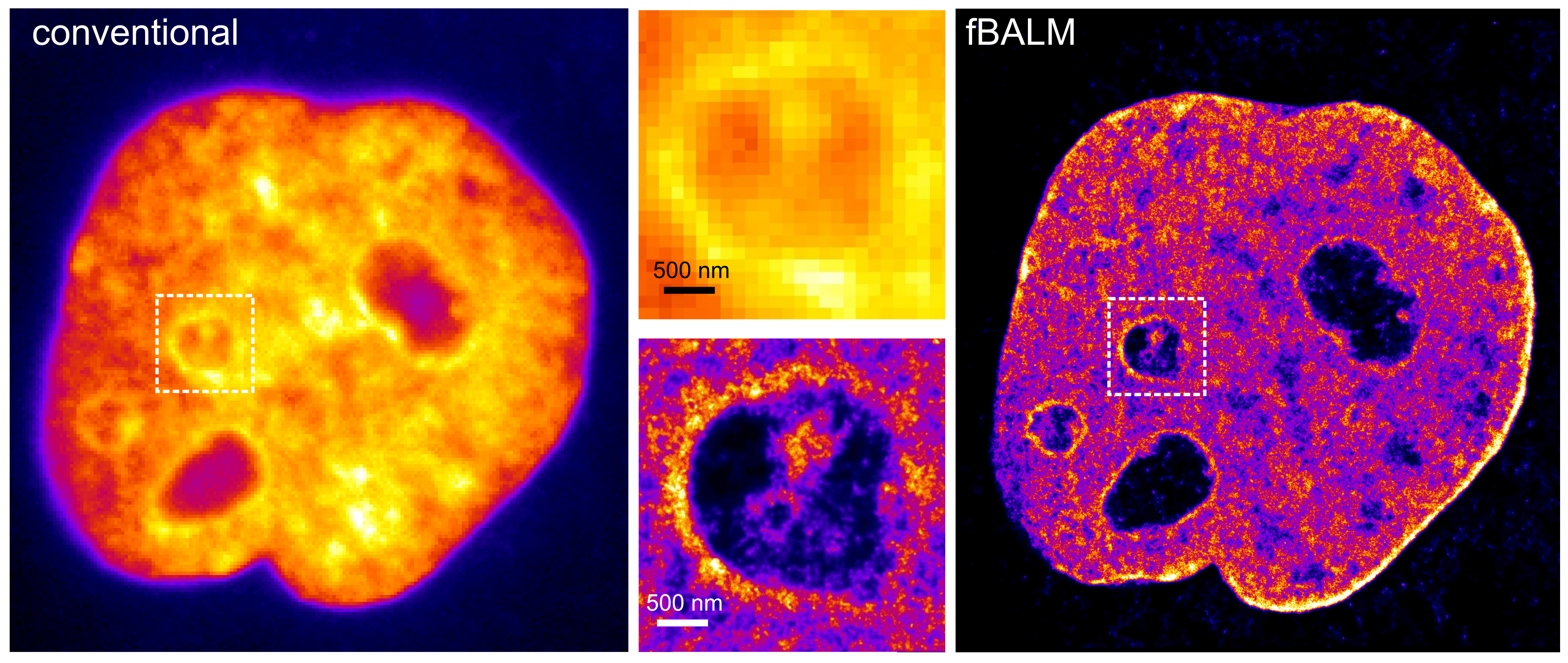
fBALM Super-resolution single molecule localisation microscopy using DNA structure fluctuation assisted binding activated localisation microscopy

== Fundamental developments ==
=== Developing the concept of 4Pi microscopy ===
Cremer was involved early in the further development of laser based light microscopy approaches. First ideas had their origin in his graduate student years in the 1970s. Jointly with his brother Thomas Cremer, now professor (chair) of Anthropology and Human Genetics at LMU Munich, Christoph Cremer proposed the development of a hologram-based laser scanning 4Pi microscope. The basic idea was to focus laser light from all sides (space angle 4Pi) in a spot with a diameter smaller than the conventional laser focus and to scan the object by means of this spot. In this manner, it should be possible to achieve an improved optical resolution beyond the conventional limit of approx. 200 nm lateral, 600 nm axial. However the publication from 1978 had drawn an improper physical conclusion (i.e. a point-like spot of light) and had completely missed the axial resolution increase as the actual benefit of adding the other side of the solid angle. Since 1992, 4Pi microscopy developed by Stefan Hell (Max-Planck Institute for Biophysical Chemistry, Göttingen) into a highly efficient, high-resolution imaging process, using two microscope objective lenses of high numeric aperture opposing each other.

=== Development of the first DNA laser-UV-microirradiation technique for living cells ===
In the early 1970s, the brothers realized a UV laser micro irradiation instrument which for the first time made it possible to irradiate in a controlled manner only a tiny part of a living cell at the absorption maximum for DNA (257 nm). This replaced the conventional UV partial irradiation practiced for over 60 years. In this way, it was possible for the first time to induce alterations in the DNA in a focused manner (i.e. at predetermined places in the cell nucleus of living cells) without compromising the cells ability to divide and to survive. Specific very small cell regions could be irradiated and thus the dynamics of macromolecules (DNA) contained there quantitatively estimated. Furthermore, due to the high speed of the process using irradiation times of fractions of a second, it became possible to irradiate even moving cell organelles. This development provided the basis for important experiments in the area of genome structure research (establishing the existence of so-called chromosome territories in living mammalian cells) and led, a few years later (1979/1980) to a successful collaboration with the biologist Christiane Nüsslein-Volhard (Max Planck Institute for Developmental Biology, Tübingen). In this collaboration Cremer used his UV laser micro irradiation equipment to elicit cellular changes in the early larval stages of the fruit fly Drosophila melanogaster.

=== Development of the confocal laser scanning microscopy for fluorescence ===
On the basis of experience gained in the construction and application of the UV laser micro irradiation instrument, the Cremer brothers designed in 1978 a laser scanning process which scans point-by-point the three-dimensional surface of an object by means of a focused laser beam and creates the over-all picture by electronic means similar to those used in scanning electron microscopes. It is this plan for the construction of a confocal laser scanning microscope (CSLM), which for the first time combined the laser scanning method with the 3D detection of biological objects labeled with fluorescent markers that earned Cremer his professorial position at Heidelberg University. During the next decade, the confocal fluorescence microscopy was developed into a technically fully matured state in particular by groups working at the University of Amsterdam and the European Molecular Biology Laboratory (EMBL) in Heidelberg and their industry partners. In later years, this technology was adopted widely by biomolecular and biomedical laboratories and remains to this day the gold standard as far as three-dimensional light microscopy with conventional resolution is concerned.

=== Development of the super resolution microscopy methods ===
The goal of microscopy is in many cases to determine the size of individual, small objects. Conventional fluorescence microscopy can only establish sizes to around the conventional optical resolution limit of approximately 200 nm (lateral). More than 20 years after submitting the 4 pi patent application, Christoph Cremer returned to the problem of the diffraction limit. With the Vertico SMI microscope he could realize his various super resolution techniques including SMI, SPDM, SPDMphymod and LIMON. These methods are mainly used for biomedical applications

==== Spatially Modulated Illumination SMI ====
Around 1995, he commenced with the development of a light microscopic process, which achieved a substantially improved size resolution of cellular nanostructures stained with a fluorescent marker. This time he employed the principle of wide field microscopy combined with structured laser illumination (spatially modulated illumination, SMI) Currently, a size resolution of 30 – 40 nm (approximately 1/16 – 1/13 of the wavelength used) is being achieved. In addition, this technology is no longer subjected to the speed limitations of the focusing microscopy so that it becomes possible to undertake 3D analyses of whole cells within short observation times (at the moment around a few seconds). Disambiguation SMI: S = spatially, M = Modulated I= Illumination.

==== Localization Microscopy SPDM ====
Also around 1995, Cremer developed and realized new fluorescence based wide field microscopy approaches which had as their goal the improvement of the effective optical resolution (in terms of the smallest detectable distance between two localized objects) down to a fraction of the conventional resolution (spectral precision distance/position determination microscopy, SPDM; Disambiguation SPDM: S = Spectral, P = Precision, D = Distance, M = Microscopy).

==== Localization Microscopy SPDMphymod ====
With this method, it is possible to use conventional, well established and inexpensive fluorescent dyes, standard like GFP, RFP, YFP, Alexa 488, Alexa 568, Alexa 647, Cy2, Cy3, Atto 488 and fluorescein. in contrast to other localization microscopy technologies that need two laser wavelengths when special photo-switchable/photo-activatable fluorescence molecules are used. A further example for the use of SPDMphymod is an analysis of Tobacco mosaic virus (TMV) particles. or virus–cell interaction.

Disambiguation SPDMphymod: S = Spectral, P = Precision D = Distance, M = Microscopy, phy = physically, mod = modifiable

==== 3D Light microscopical nanosizing (LIMON) microscopy ====
Combining SPDM and SMI, known as LIMON microscopy. Christoph Cremer can currently achieve a resolution of approx. 10 nm in 2D and 40 nm in 3D in wide field images of whole living cells. Widefield 3D "nanoimages" of whole living cells currently still take about two minutes, but work to reduce this further is currently under way. Vertico-SMI is currently the fastest optical 3D nanoscope for the three-dimensional structural analysis of whole cells worldwide As a biological application in the 3D dual color mode the spatial arrangements of Her2/neu and Her3 clusters was achieved. The positions in all three directions of the protein clusters could be determined with an accuracy of about 25 nm.
