= SportsLogos.net =

Canadian sports website

Chris Creamer's SportsLogos.net
- Website type: News, informational, online community
- Owner: Chris Creamer
- Website: http://www.sportslogos.net
- Commercial: Yes
- Registration: Optional; required for participation in forums
- Launched: 1997; 29 years ago

SportsLogos.net, officially Chris Creamer's SportsLogos.net, is a Canadian sports website devoted to the display and study of sports logos and their associated uses in media. The site was founded in 1997 with an initial focus on the major professional sports leagues in the United States and Canada and their individual teams, but has since grown to include a number of additional related features. Historical and commemorative logos and uniforms are included for teams and leagues, along with those for collegiate athletic programs and conferences, minor leagues, and international leagues. The site also hosts a discussion forum with nearly 40,000 registered users as of 2020, and posts regular news updates related to logos and team uniforms.

== History ==
The site was founded by Chris Creamer in 1997, then a 14-year-old living in Oshawa, Ontario. He created it as a personal website to share his interest in sports logos. His family had gotten home Internet service the year before and he had previously set up an earlier personal site that covered a broader range of interests. It was at the recommendation of his father that he focus on one particular interest, so he chose sports logos. The website, which was hosted for many years on free servers like Angelfire, GeoCities, and Tripod.com using inline linking to images of the logos, was eventually able to move to its own hosting space through donations.

The initial focus of the website was exclusively sports logos, both current and historical, from the major professional sports leagues in the United States and Canada and was intended simply as a personal interest website. Being based in Canada, the site first featured logos from the Canadian Football League (CFL) and the National Hockey League (NHL). Over time, logos were added from other North American sports leagues from Major League Baseball (MLB), the National Football League (NFL), and the National Basketball Association (NBA) to lesser known leagues like the American Basketball League. The site has grown to include logos from a number of additional professional and collegiate leagues, conferences, and organizations both in and outside of North America such the National Collegiate Athletic Association (NCAA), FIFA, the Olympic Games, and NASCAR. Uniform images—historic, current, and commemorative—were later added for many of the sports, particularly the North American major professional leagues.

Discussion forums were added as early as 1999 and have since grown to include nearly 40,000 registered users as of 2019. Regular news updates related to logos and uniforms were added around 2012, along with a social media presence on Facebook, Twitter, Instagram, and YouTube. By late 2015, SportsLogos.net had nearly 35,000 logo images hosted on the site and generated approximately 100 million hits per year. Both Creamer and the site are regularly referenced for logo and uniform-related news and imagery from a variety of media sources, including NHL.com, the Toronto Star, FoxSports.com, and CBSSports.com. As part of the redesign of the Sports Reference websites in 2016, an agreement was reached to use copies of the logo files on their various sites and pages, such as Baseball-Reference.com and Pro-Football-Reference.com.
