= Jacob Jan Cremer =

Dutch novelist

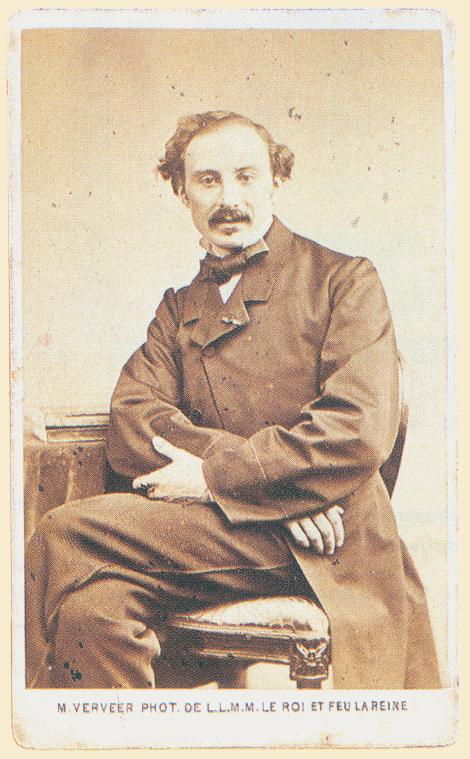
J. J. Cremer. Photograph by M. Verveer

Jacob Jan Cremer (1 September 1837 – 5 June 1880), birth name Jacobus and also known as J. J. Cremer, was a Dutch novelist.

== Life ==
Cremer was born in Arnhem and started life as a painter, but soon exchanged the brush for the pen, although he also continued to paint. For much of his adult life he lived in The Hague. His first novellas, Betuwsche Novellen and Overbetuwsche Novellen, were first published about 1855 and reprinted many times subsequently; they were also translated into German and French. These short stories of Dutch provincial life are written in the dialect of the Betuwe, the large flat Gelderland island, formed by the Rhine, whose name recalls the presumed earliest inhabitants, the Batavi.

In his later novels Cremer abandoned both the language and the love-stories of the Betuwe, depicting the Dutch life of other centres in the national tongue. His principal works include: Anna Rooze (1867), Dokter Helmond en zijn Vrouw (1870), Hanna de Freule (1873), and Daniel Sils. Cremer was less successful as a playwright, and his two comedies, Peasant and Nobleman and Emma Bertholt, did not enhance his fame; nor did a volume of poems, published in 1873. He died in The Hague.

His collected novels were published in Leiden. An English-language novel by Albert Dresden Vandam, based on Anna Rooze, was published in London (1877, 3 volumes) under the title of An Everyday Heroine.

== Assessment ==
According to the Encyclopædia Britannica Eleventh Edition, Cremer is strongest in his delineation of character. His picturesque humour, coming out most forcibly in his numerous readings of the Betuwe novelettes, soon procured him the name of the "Dutch Fritz Reuter."
