= Thomas Cremer =

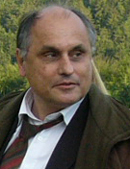
- Thomas Cremer
- Born: 7 July 1945 (age 81); Miesbach, Germany
- Scientific career
- Fields: genetics
- Workplaces: Institute of Anthropology and Human Genetics at LMU Munich

Thomas Cremer (born 7 July 1945 in Miesbach, Germany), is a German professor of human genetics and anthropology with a main research focus on molecular cytogenetics and 3D/4D analyses of nuclear structure studied by fluorescence microscopy including super-resolution microscopy and live cell imaging. Thomas Cremer is the brother of the German physicist Christoph Cremer and Georg Cremer, Secretary General of the German Caritas Association.

== Biography ==
Thomas Cremer was raised in Aachen. He studied medicine at the Human Medical School, University of Freiburg, where he graduated in 1970 and received his doctoral degree in 1973. From 1974 to 1978, he was leader of a research group at the Institute of Anthropology and Human Genetics, University of Freiburg, followed by a fellowship as research associate at the University of California, Irvine (1978) in the group of M.W. Berns. From 1978 to 1996, he headed an independent research group at the Institute of Anthropology and Human Genetics, Heidelberg University. In 1986, he received a Heisenberg scholarship of the Deutsche Forschungsgemeinschaft combined with a position as visiting professor at Yale University, New Haven, Connecticut in the group of Laura Manuelidis and David C. Ward. From 1996 to 2010, he held the position of a Full Professor, Chair of Anthropology and Human Genetics in the Faculty of Biology at LMU Munich. Thomas Cremer is corresponding member of the Academy of Sciences Heidelberg (2001) and member of the German Academy of Sciences Leopoldina (2006). Since his retirement 10/2010 he has continued several research projects at LMU Munich.

== Scientific contributions ==
Thomas Cremer was an early supporter of the idea that higher order chromatin arrangement and the architecture of the nucleus are essential for cardinal nuclear functions. Spatial organization of chromatin, now considered as the highest level of epigenetic gene regulation, has been the focus of his research since the early 70s. Together with his brother Christoph Cremer, he pioneered laser-UV-microirradiation experiments that indirectly implied a territorial organization of chromosomes in the interphase nucleus. This finding led Cremer to his concept of a new field of cytogenetic research, called by him as interphase cytogenetics. Realization of interphase cytogenetics was achieved during the 1980s where Cremer made major contributions to the development of in situ hybridization techniques to visualize normal and aberrant chromosomes and chromosomal subregions directly in the cell nucleus and provided direct evidence for chromosome territories (CTs). During the 1990s, he realized together with P. Lichter the concept of comparative genomic hybridization to metaphase chromosomes and to a matrix with DNA spots representing specific genomic sites. During the late 1990s until now his laboratory has made major achievements in 3D multicolor FISH allowing the simultaneous visualization of all human chromosomes in human cells. In addition, he developed methods to visualize individual CTs and nuclear subcompartments to study their dynamics in living cells. Cremer has achieved major insight to compare nuclear phenotypes in a variety of species, ranging from primates, birds to the micro- and macronucleus of ciliates with the goal to classify universally valid, species and cell-type specific normal features of nuclear architecture and distinguish them from disease correlated features.

== Scientific awards ==
- 2005: Maffo Vialli International Award for Histochemistry for pioneering contributions to the study of higher order chromatin arrangement through laser-UV microirradiation and fluorescence based molecular cytogenetics.
- 2009: Award of the Schleiden Medal of the German Academy of Sciences Leopoldina for his distinguished scientific work on nuclear architecture with special focus on the topography of chromosomes in the nucleus.
- 2011: Award of the "Medal of honor" from the German Society of Human Genetics
- 2011: Honorary member of the European Cytogenetics Association (E.C.A.)
- 2015: Award of the "Wilhelm Bernhard Medal" together with his wife Marion Cremer for their joint contributions on genome structure and function.

== Literature ==
- Cremer T, Cremer M, Hübner B, Strickfaden H, Smeets D, Popken J, Sterr M, Markaki J, Rippe K, Cremer C (2015). "The 4D nucleome: Evidence for a dynamic nuclear landscape based on co-aligned active and inactive nuclear compartments". FEBS Letters. 589 (20PartA): 2931–2943. Bibcode:2015FEBSL.589.2931C. doi:10.1016/j.febslet.2015.05.037. PMID 26028501.
- Cremer T, Cremer M (2010), "Chromosome territories", Cold Spring Harbor Perspectives in Biology, 2 (3) a003889, doi:10.1101/cshperspect.a003889, PMC 2829961, PMID 20300217
- Markaki Y, Gunkel M, Schermelleh L, Beichmanis S, Neumann J, Heidemann M, Leonhardt H, Eick D, Cremer C, Cremer T (2010). "Functional nuclear organization of transcription and DNA replication: a topographical marriage between chromatin domains and the interchromatin compartment". Cold Spring Harbor Symposia on Quantitative Biology. 75: 475–492. doi:10.1101/sqb.2010.75.042. PMID 21467142.
- Strickfaden H, Zunhammer A, van Koeningsbroggen S, Koehler D, Cremer T (May 2010). "4D chromatin dynamics in cycling cells - Theodor Boveri's hypotheses revisited". Nucleus. 1 (3): 284–297. doi:10.4161/nucl.1.3.11969. PMC 3027035. PMID 21327076.
- Solovei I, Kreysing M, Lanctôt C, Kösem S, Peichl L, Cremer T, Guck J, Joffe B (April 2009). "Nuclear architecture of rod photoreceptor cells adapts to vision in mammalian evolution". Cell. 137 (2): 356–68. doi:10.1016/j.cell.2009.01.052. PMID 19379699.
- Lanctôt C, Cheutin T, Cremer M, Cavalli G, Cremer T (February 2007). "Dynamic genome architecture in the nuclear space: regulation of gene expression in three dimensions". Nature Reviews Genetics. 8 (2): 104–15. doi:10.1038/nrg2041. PMID 17230197. S2CID 31149161.
- Cremer T, Cremer C (2006). "Rise, fall and resurrection of chromosome territories: a historical perspective. Part II. Fall and resurrection of chromosome territories during the 1950s to 1980s. Part III. Chromosome territories and the functional nuclear architecture: experiments and models from the 1990s to the present". Eur J Histochem. 50 (4): 223–72. PMID 17213034.
- Cremer T, Cremer M, Dietzel S, Müller S, Solovei I, Fakan S (June 2006). "Chromosome territories--a functional nuclear landscape". Current Opinion in Cell Biology. 18 (3): 307–16. doi:10.1016/j.ceb.2006.04.007. PMID 16687245.
- Cremer T, Cremer C (April 2001). "Chromosome territories, nuclear architecture and gene regulation in mammalian cells". Nature Reviews Genetics. 2 (4): 292–301. doi:10.1038/35066075. PMID 11283701. S2CID 8547149.
- Cremer T, Lichter P, Borden J, Ward DC, Manuelidis L (November 1988). "Detection of chromosome aberrations in metaphase and interphase tumor cells by in situ hybridization using chromosome-specific library probes". Hum. Genet. 80 (3): 235–46. doi:10.1007/BF01790091. PMID 3192213. S2CID 14660591.
- Schardin M, Cremer T, Hager HD, Lang M (1985). "Specific staining of human chromosomes in Chinese hamster x man hybrid cell lines demonstrates interphase chromosome territories". Hum. Genet. 71 (4): 281–7. doi:10.1007/BF00388452. PMID 2416668. S2CID 9261461.
- Cremer T, Cremer C, Schneider T, Baumann H, Hens L, Kirsch-Volders M (1982). "Analysis of chromosome positions in the interphase nucleus of Chinese hamster cells by laser-UV-microirradiation experiments". Hum. Genet. 62 (3): 201–9. doi:10.1007/BF00333519. PMID 7169211. S2CID 13237449.
- Zorn, Christian; Cremer, Christoph; Cremer, Thomas; Zimmer, Jürgen (1979). "Unscheduled DNA synthesis after partial UV irradiation of the cell nucleus". Experimental Cell Research. 124 (1): 111–119. doi:10.1016/0014-4827(79)90261-1.
