= Cramer (surname) =

Cramer /ˈkreɪmər/ is an English surname and the Anglicized version of Dutch and Low German Kramer, or German Krämer (pronounced [ˈkʁɛːmɐ]). Both refer to the profession of traveling merchants in the Late Middle Ages. The meaning later changed to "merchants trading with different, rather small things.

Notable people with the name include:

== People ==
- Anthony Cramer, appellant in Cramer v. United States (U.S. Supreme Court, 1945)
- Carl Eduard Cramer (botanist) (1831–1901), Swiss botanist
- Casey Cramer (born 1982), American football player
- Chris Cramer (1948–2021), British news journalist and executive
- Christopher J. Cramer (born 1961), American chemist
- Clayton Cramer, American historian and software engineer
- Daffi Cramer (born 1954), German singer
- Daniel Cramer (1568–1637), German Lutheran theologian
- Doc Cramer (1905–1990), American baseball player
- Dorothy Cramer, American baseball player
- Douglas S. Cramer, American TV producer
- Duncan Cramer (1901–1980), American cinematic art director
- Dylan Cramer (born 1958), Canadian jazz musician
- Ernst Cramer (architect) (1898–1980), Swiss landscape architect
- Ernst J. Cramer (1913–2010), American journalist
- Ernst Cramer (politician) (1960), Dutch politician
- Floyd Cramer (1933–1997), American pianist
- Franz Cramer (violinist) (1772–1848), English violinist and Master of the Queen's Music
- Gabe Cramer (born 1994), Israeli-Canadian-American baseball player
- Gabriel Cramer (1704–1752), Swiss mathematician, discoverer of Cramer's rule
- Cramer brothers, Gabriel and Philibert Cramer, 18th century Swiss publishers
- Gail Cramer, American agricultural economist
- Grant Cramer (born 1961), American actor
- Hank Cramer (born 1953), American folk singer
- Hans Cramer (1896–1968), German general
- Harald Cramér (1893–1985), Swedish mathematician
- Harriet L. Cramer (1847–1922), American newspaper publisher
- Helene Cramer (1844–1916), German painter
- Hugh B. Cramer (1915–2000), American politician
- Jacqueline Cramer (born 1951), Dutch politician
- Jayme Cramer (born 1983), American swimmer
- Jim Cramer (born 1955), American investment manager and television personality
- Joey Cramer (born 1973), Canadian child actor
- Johann Baptist Cramer (1771–1858), German pianist and composer
- Johann Cramer (1905–1987), German politician
- John Cramer (Australian politician) (1896–1994)
- John Cramer (representative) (1779–1870), American politician from New York
- John Antony Cramer (1793–1848), English classical scholar and geographer
- John G. Cramer (born 1934), American physicist and science fiction author
- Johann Ulrich von Cramer (1706–1772), German judge, legal scholar, and philosopher
- Karl von Cramer (1818–1902), Bavarian politician
- Kathryn Cramer (born 1962), American science fiction author and editor
- Kevin Cramer (born 1961), American politician from North Dakota
- Lawrence William Cramer (1897–1978), Governor of the United States Virgin Islands
- Lea-Sophie Cramer (born 1987), German entrepreneur
- Mars Cramer (1928–2014), Dutch economist
- Michael Cramer (actor) (1930–2000), German actor
- Michael Cramer (politician) (born 1949), German politician
- Molly Cramer (1852–1936), German painter
- Morten Cramer (born 1967), Danish football player
- Patrick Cramer (born 1969), German biochemist
- Peggy Cramer (1937–2016), American baseball player
- Phebe Cramer (1935–2021), American clinical psychologist and academic
- Philippe Cramer (born 1970), Swiss furniture and wallpaper designer
- Philo Cramer, American guitarist
- Pieter Cramer (1721–1776), Dutch wool merchant and entomologist
- Richard Cramer (1889–1960), American actor
- Richard Ben Cramer (1950–2013), American journalist and author
- Rie Cramer (1887–1977), Dutch writer and illustrator
- Robert E. Cramer (born 1947), American politician from Alabama
- Ronald Cramer (born 1968), Dutch cryptographer
- Ronnie Cramer (1957–2021), American artist, composer and filmmaker
- Tracy Cramer, American politician
- Walter Cramer (1886–1944), German businessman and anti-Hitler conspirator
- Wilhelm Cramer (1746–1799), German-British violinist, best known for the "Cramer bow"
- William Cramer (pathologist) (1878–1945), German-born pathologist
- William C. Cramer (1922–2003), American politician from Florida
- Zadok Cramer (1773–1813), American author and publisher

== In fiction ==
- Cramer family, characters on the U.S. soap opera One Life to Live
- Inspector Cramer, recurring character in the Nero Wolfe detective stories
- Jason Cramer, character on the HBO drama Oz
- Jerry Cramer, a character in the 1990 American comedy movie Ski Patrol
- Nurse Cramer, character in Catch-22 by Joseph Heller

== See also ==
- Cremer, surname
- Kramer (surname)
