= Ernst Cramer =

Ernst Cramer may refer to:

- Ernst Cramer (architect) (1898–1980), Swiss architect
- Ernst Cramer (journalist) (1913–2010), German journalist
- Ernst Cramer (politician) (born 1960), Dutch politician
