= Landschaftspark Duisburg-Nord =

Public park in Duisburg-Meiderich, Germany

Coordinates: 51°28′49″N 6°46′48″E

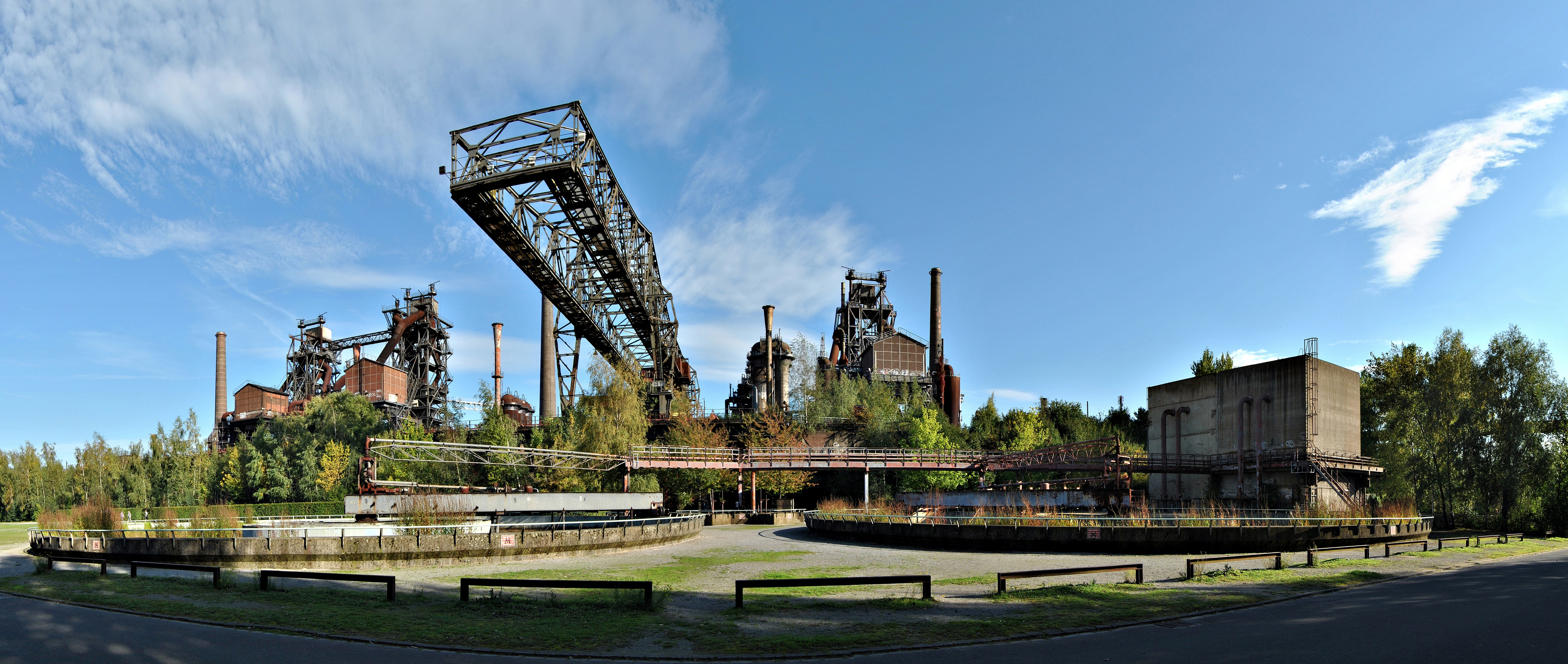
Some of the most important structures at Landschaftspark Duisburg-Nord

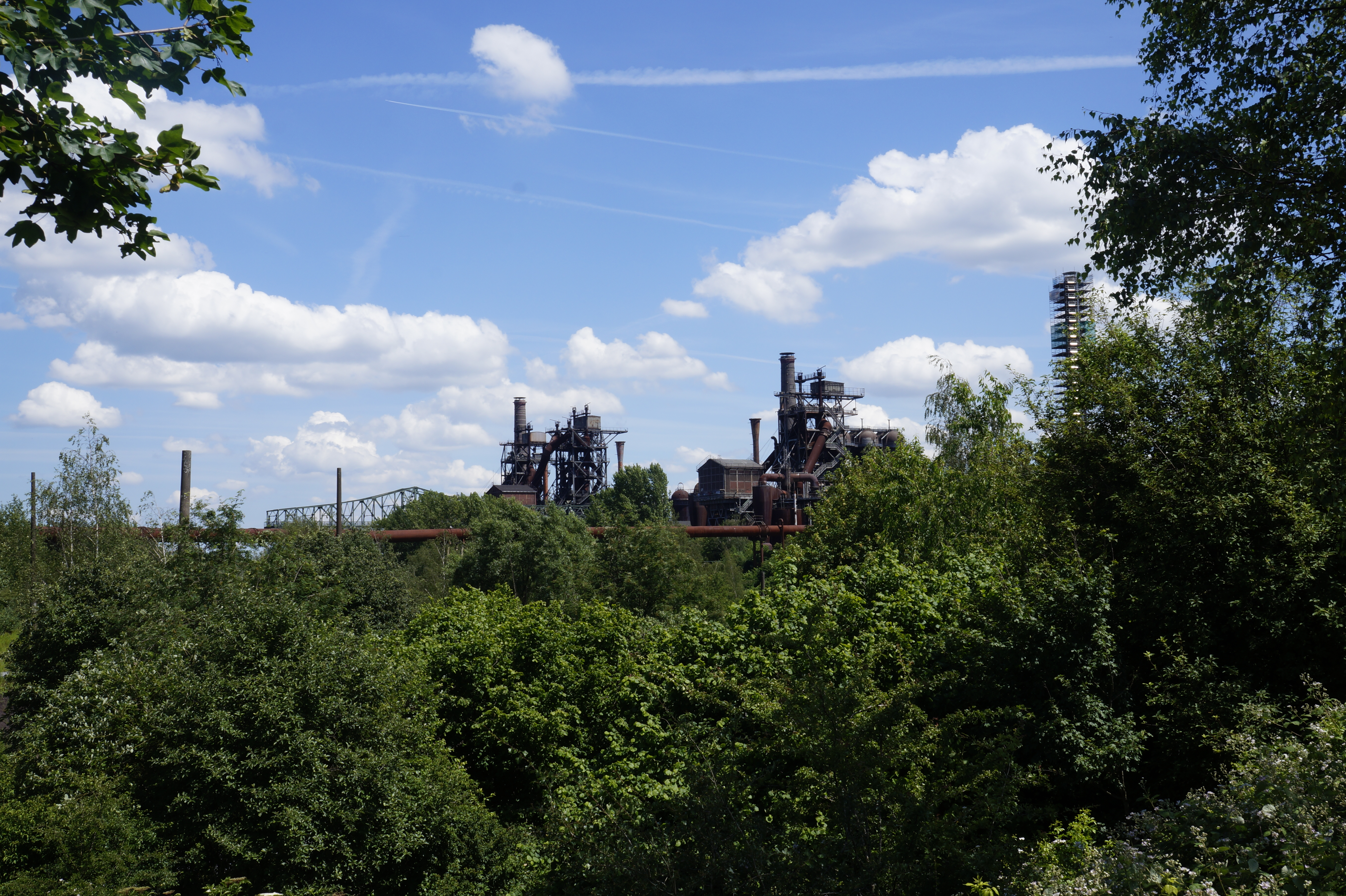
Furnace

Landschaftspark is a public park located in Duisburg-Meiderich, Germany.

It was designed in 1991 by Latz + Partner (Peter Latz), with the intention that it work to heal and understand the industrial past, rather than trying to reject it. The park closely associates itself with the past uses of the site: a coal and steel production plant (abandoned in 1985, leaving the area polluted) and the agricultural land it had been prior to the mid 19th century. It is one of the many places in Germany to rescue historic wooden cooling towers from demolition as it has saved two of its wooden cooling towers.

== Conception and creation ==
The park contains the former site of the Thyssen Ironworks in Duisburg-Meiderich, which produced pig iron from 1901 to 1985. The park includes various inoperative industrial smelting equipment, including three of the former works' blast furnaces.

In 1991, a co-operative-concurrent planning procedure with five international planning teams was held to design the park. Peter Latz’s design was significant, as it attempted to preserve as much of the existing site as possible (Diedrich, 69). Unlike his competitors, Latz recognized the value of the site's current condition (Weilacher, 106). He allowed the polluted soils to remain in place and be remediated through phytoremediation, and sequestered soils with high toxicity in the existing bunkers. He also found new uses for many of the old structures, and turned the former sewage canal into a method of cleansing the site.

== Design ==
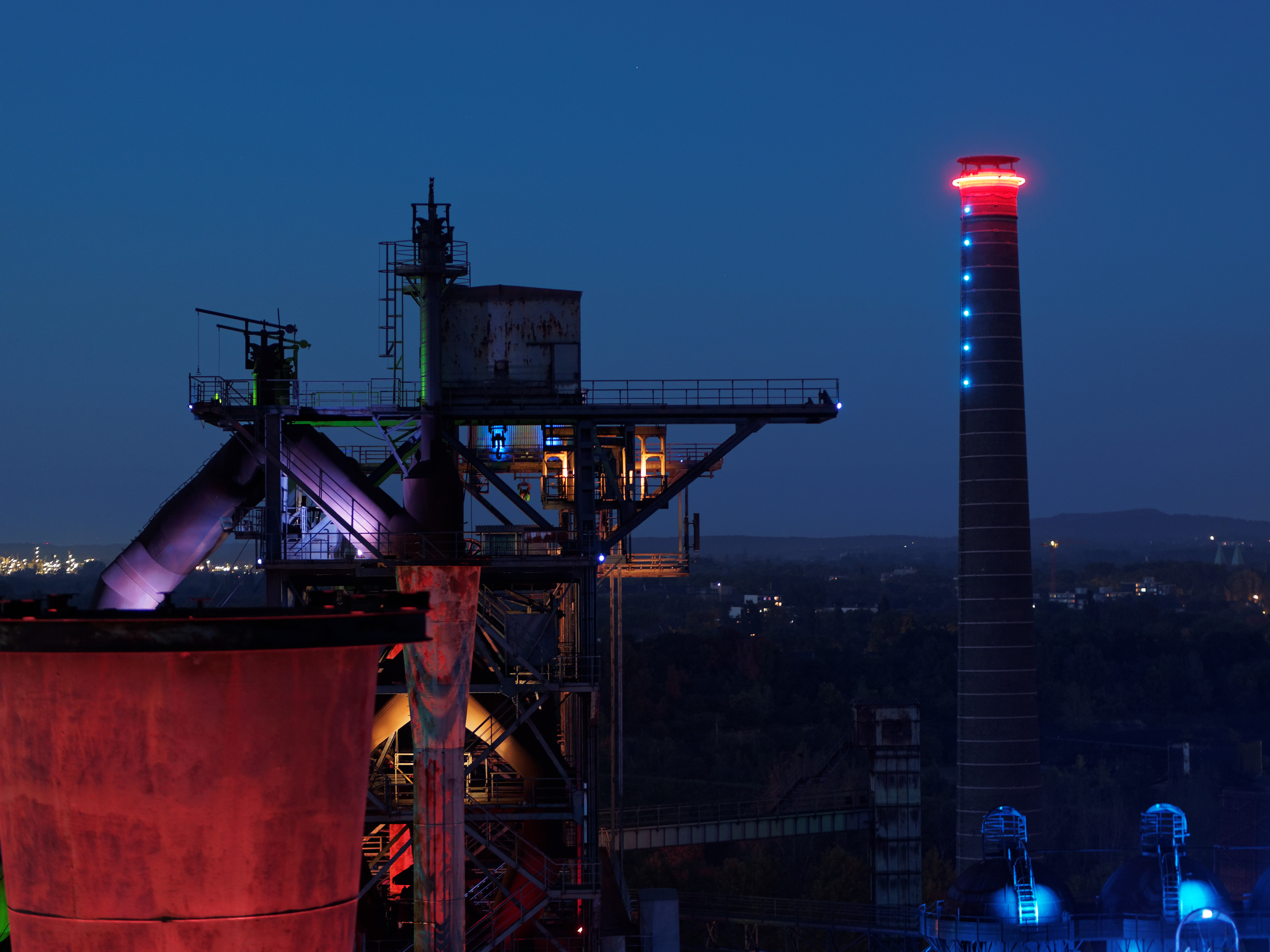
Light installations by Jonathan Park

The park is divided into different areas, whose borders were developed by looking at existing conditions (such as how the site had been divided by existing roads and railways, what types of plants had begun to grow in each area, etc.). This piecemeal pattern was then woven together by a series of walkways and waterways, which were placed according to the old railway and sewer systems. While each piece retains its character, it also creates a dialogue with the site surrounding it. Within the main complex, Latz emphasized specific programmatic elements: the concrete bunkers create a space for a series of intimate gardens, old gas tanks have become pools for scuba divers, concrete walls are used by rock climbers, an area of the factory, the middle of the former steel mill, had been made into a piazza. Each of these spaces uses elements to allow for a specific reading of time.

The site was designed with the idea that a grandfather, who might have worked at the plant, could walk with his grandchildren, explaining what he used to do and what the machinery had been used for. At Landschaftspark, memory was central to the design. Various authors have addressed the ways in which memory can inform the visitor of a site, a concept that became prevalent during Postmodernism.

=== Importance of memory ===
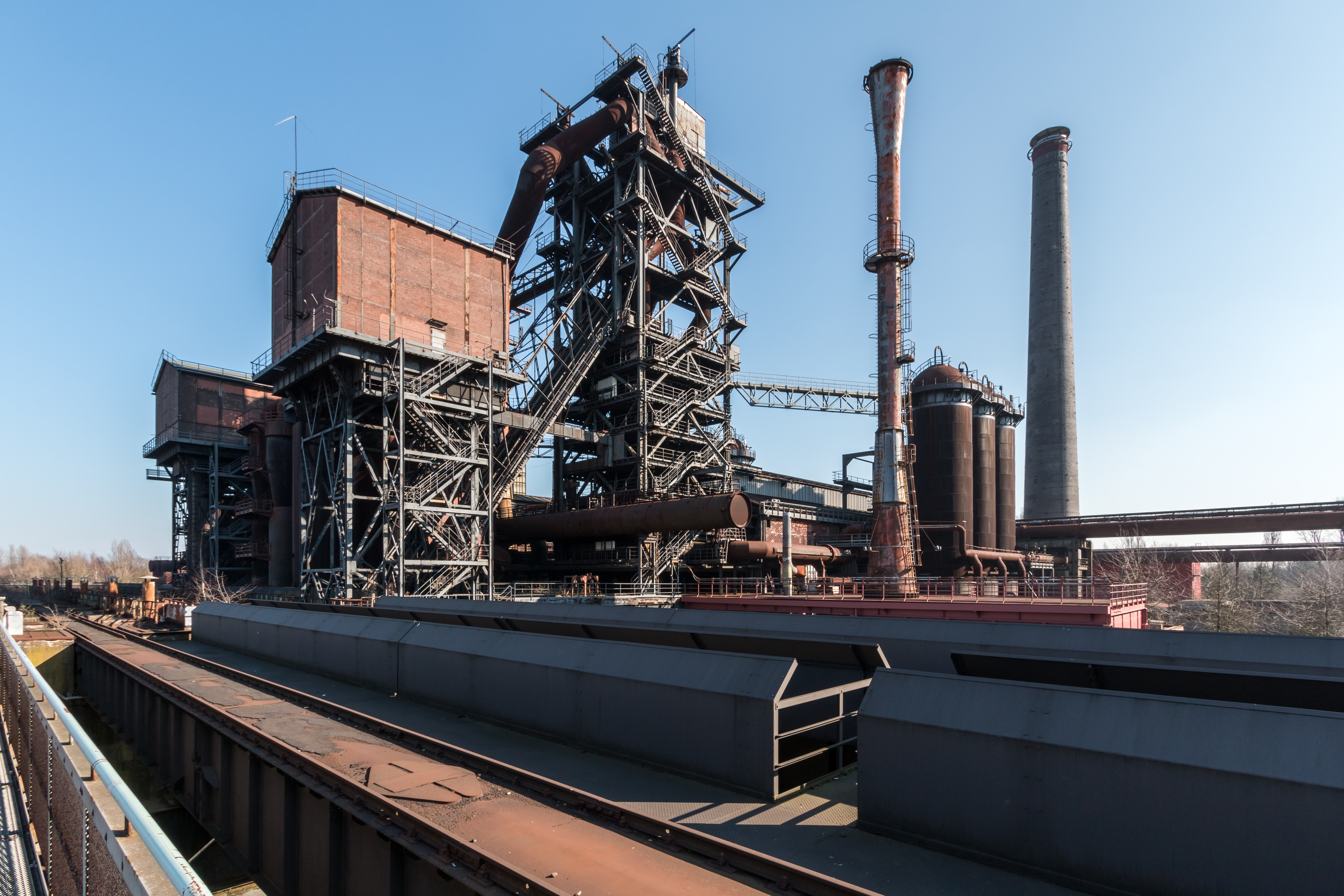
Blast furnace 2

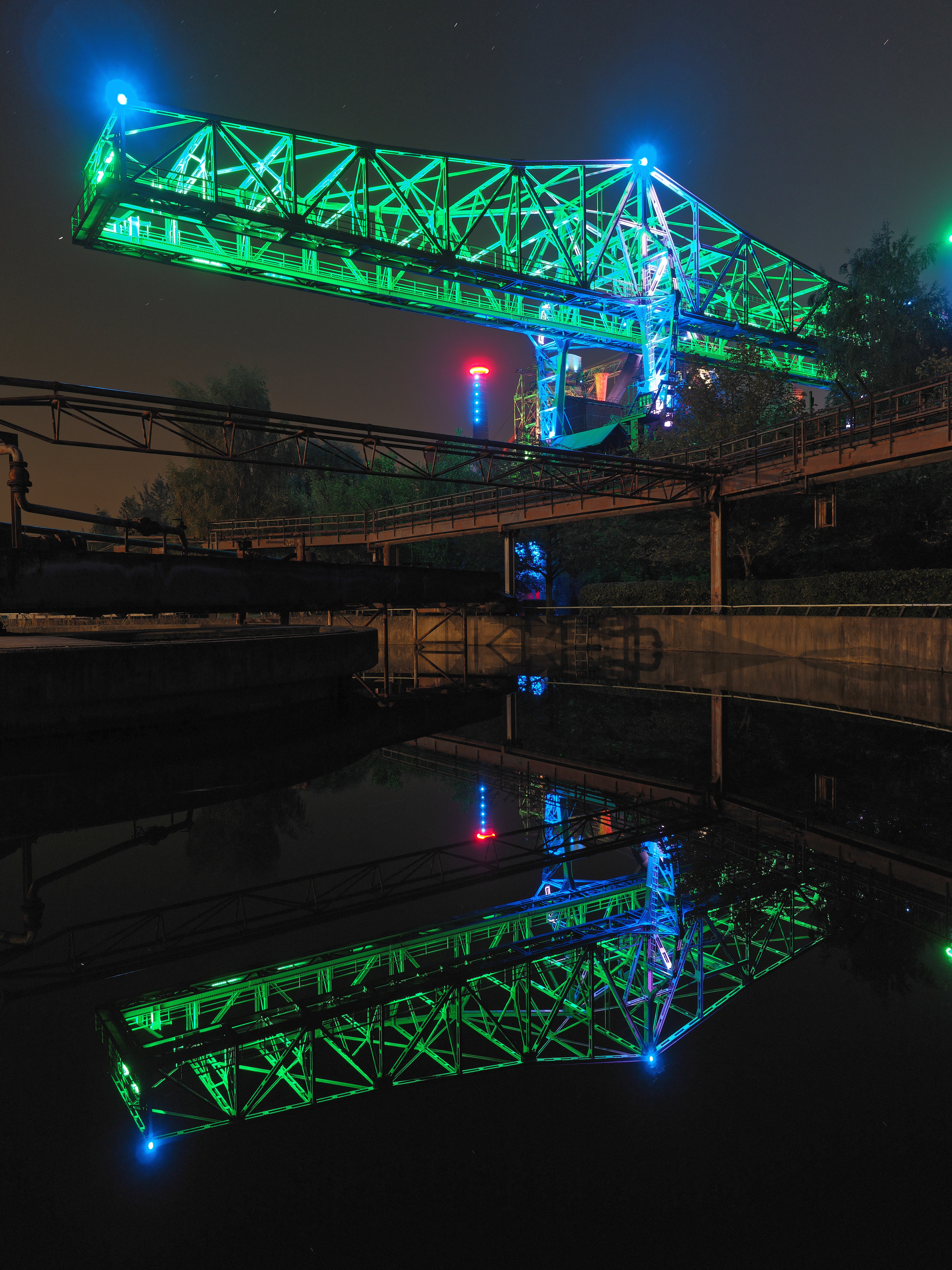
Loading bridge

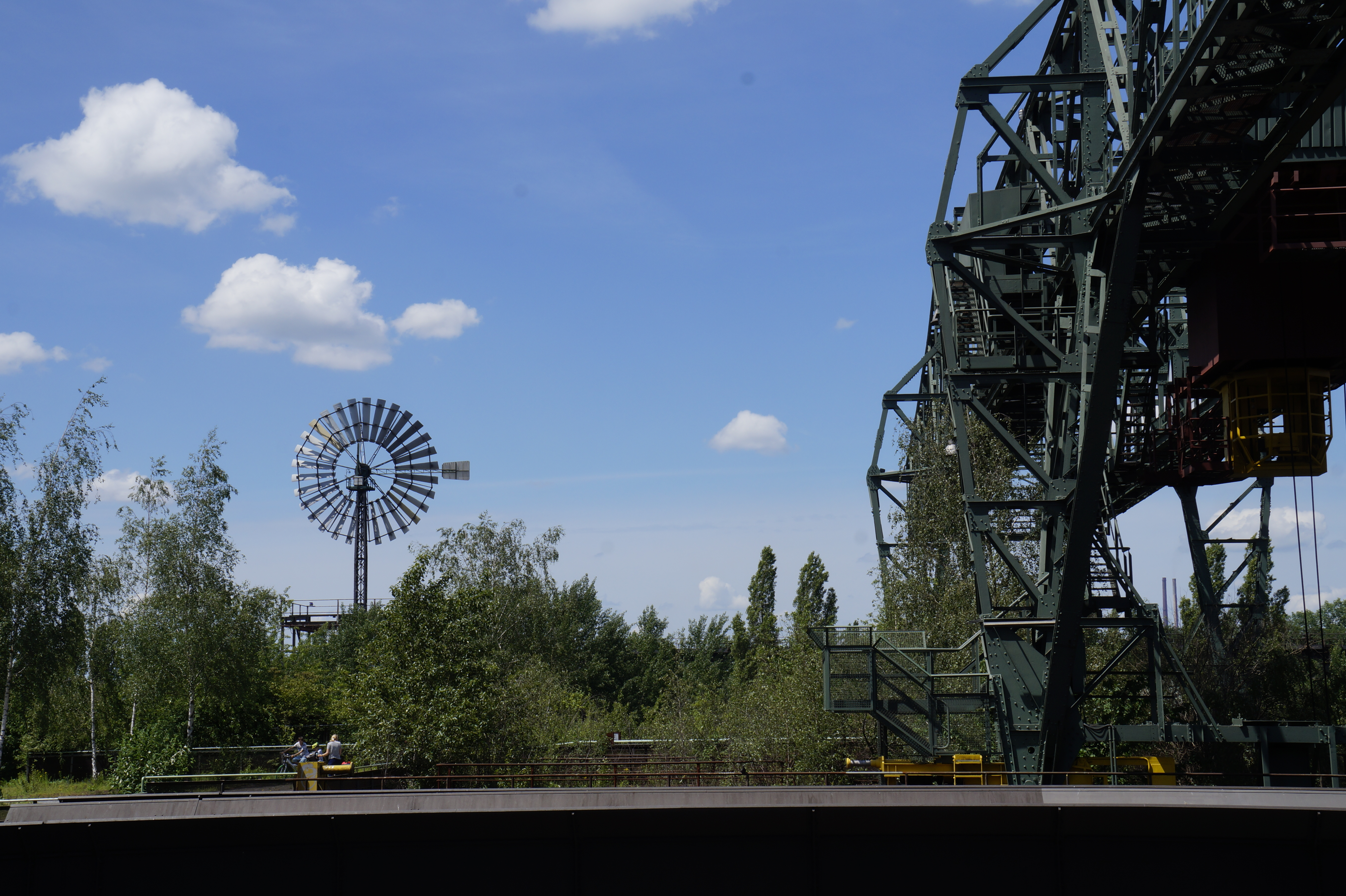
Landschaftspark Duisburg-Nord-1

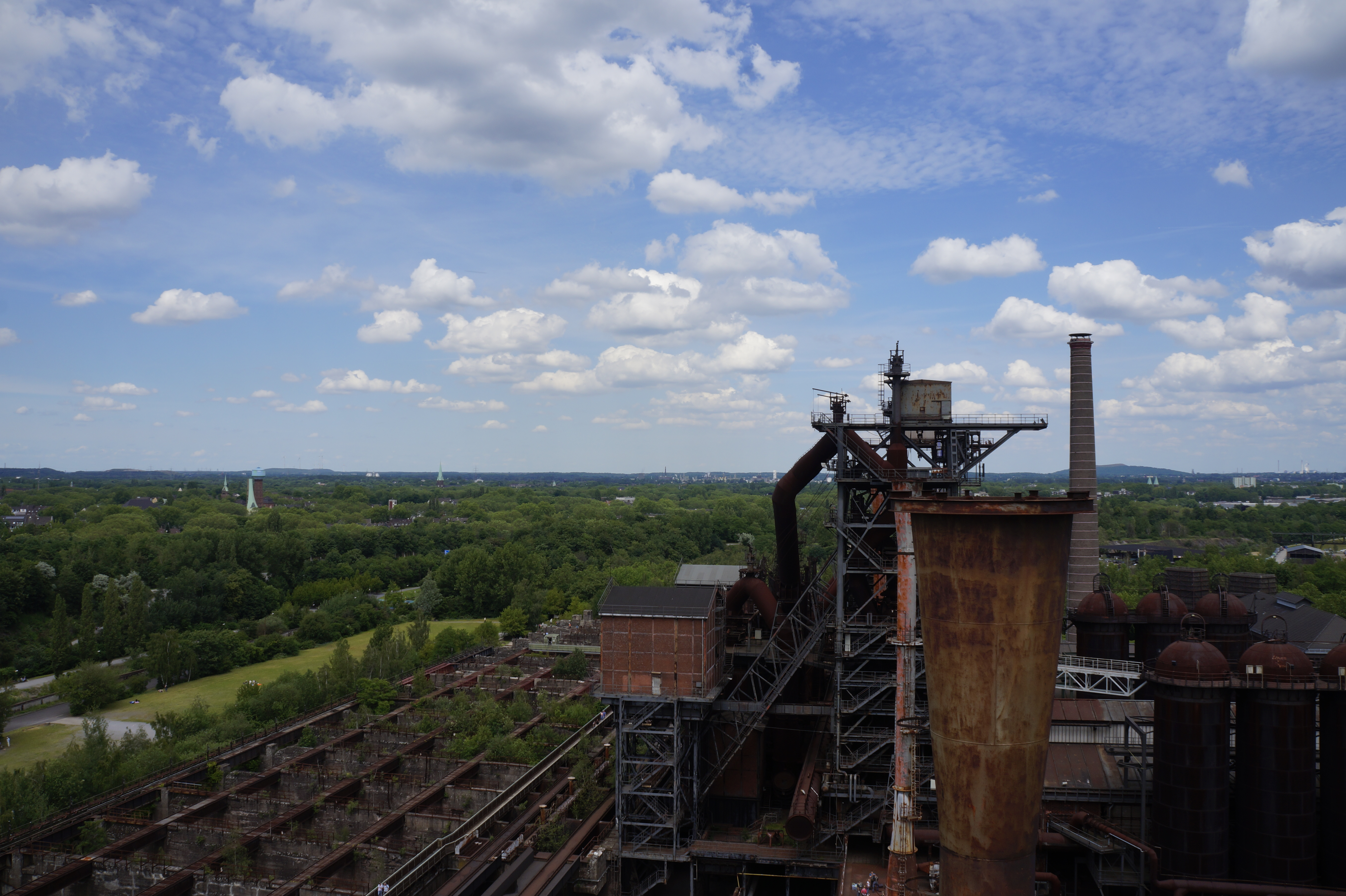

Memory has re-emerged as an important aspect of design, and has been addressed by authors such as Sebastien Marot, Frances Yates, Robert Smithson, and Peter Latz himself. For them, memory does not equal preservation but instead has a transient quality. It implies a re-representation or understanding of the past, as memories constantly shift and change as one experiences life. Marot believes that the memory of a site should be used as a design strategy, as it shows depth and a process of connection. Yates’ argument for the importance of memory comes out of her concern that architecture has become too uniform, removing the particularities of a place. These idiosyncrasies have a history with the art of memory which uses the principle of association with places. Smithson's assertion, in his article "A Tour of the Monuments of Passaic," is similar, in that memory recalls the past but in a way that applies it to new things. Finally, Latz claims that interrelations must be made concrete and visible and that the viewer will create their own picture of a place, not the designer (Latz, 94, 96).

These ideas of memory encompass Landschaftspark. A series of pathways at multiple levels connect sites scattered throughout the project, allowing visitors to construct their own experiences. These sites include the bunker gardens, where the fern garden is located. This garden was formed using railroad ties collected from other locations at the site, which might remind someone of the old railway that is now an entrance to the park. It is similar to the way Smithson's essay, "A Tour of the Monuments of Passaic," incorporates elements of the past to aid in giving meaning to things of the present (Marot, 42). By walking through the garden, an individual's memory may be sparked when they see the typical railway ties. This might then reveal new connections, as these railway ties occupy a different space than the long lines with which they are typically associated.

The sewage canal, which was believed to be in the same location as the ‘Old Emscher’ river, could not remain as it existed on the site, and was placed underground (Diedrich, 73). A new canal has taken the place of the sewage canal, but is now flowing with fresh rainwater. Instead of creating a more "naturally" shaped waterway, this new canal, the Emscher River, was kept as straight as the canal before. The canal aids in one's understanding of water processes and changes in time. Markers made by soil mounds (these also break up the culvert form) allow the depth of the water to be read by the visitor to the site. Here the visitor is able to understand on a seasonal basis the process of the site and mark their experience of the park by how high the water was.

Finally, Piazza Metallica also works with ideas of temporality and memory: the landscape architects took 49 steel plates that formerly lined the foundry pits at the site (Diedrich, 70) and installed them to mark a gathering place, intended for events and performances. However, the steel plates are not meant to last; rather, they will gradually erode and decay, portraying the natural processes occurring in the site (Steinglass, 129). In a way, this piazza represents the site as a whole: as the plates decay (like the other steel on the site), a succession of plants will grow between them. Plants will eventually fill the space, with the remains of the rusted steel among them.

== Comparing between landscape architects ==
Peter Latz tried his first important experiences in dealing with derelict industrial sites in 1985, when designing the "Harbour Island", a public park on a destroyed harbour site in Saarbrücken (Weilacher, 82).

However, the concept of redesigning industrial sites has been employed before by different architects. Several landscape architects have worked with the same mentality and culture such as Alphand's Parc des Buttes Chaumont that were constructed in old quarries; they didn't hide the main parts of the site, but work to enforce it. Richard Haag's Gas Works Park in Seattle was an important predecessor to the Landschaftspark. Rather than removing the gasworks, the design allowed parts of it to stay in place and created a mound where the soil was being remediated, allowing people to understand the process of change.

Peter Latz takes these ideas and pushes them further as he uses materials on the site to show their transient nature as they change and decompose, transforming into something else. Landschaftspark at Duisburg Nord had a clear intention of using the relics to develop its program. Within this context, each programmatic element is given a specific identity that illustrates time, while showing change in different ways. Each visitor is allowed to experience the park in their own way and create their own story. Marot explains that as the visitor is able to experience "ambivalent readings of place," their memory will be sparked in a new way, giving that place more depth (86). Marot finishes his book, Architecture and the Art of Memory, by insisting, "territories must be deepened" to provide places where memory can be fostered for cultural needs. Latz has worked to do this at Duisburg Nord in many ways (Weilacher, 102) and it has been declared as a highly successful cultural park (Steinglass, 129).

== Industrial nature ==
Industrial brownfield sites (syn. industrial wastelands) form the backbone of urban biodiversity in the central Ruhr Region and are places for experiencing nature and for environmental education.

In terms of its size, structural variety and biodiversity, the Duisburg-Nord Landscape Park occupies a prominent position. Its vegetation presents a spectrum of different development stages (succession stages) on diverse sites. These range from pioneer communities, tall herbaceous perennials and scrub formations to pioneer forests (industrial forest) and together produce a diversity of species. The Landscape Park is considered a local hotspot for biodiversity in the western Ruhr Region.

Furthermore, its industrial nature is of high ecological value because it contributes not only to the preservation of many rare and endangered species but also to the conservation of urbanised nature in the Ruhr Region’s conurbations. The Landscape Park contains this enormous species diversity because of its great variety of habitats. Besides the industrial technogenic soils around the former blast furnace site, the sinter plant, the mine and the cokery, it also includes agricultural soils at Ingenhammshof and Emstermannshof. The physiochemical properties of the soils are significantly different and so influence the species composition and plant ecology.

The Biological Station has been involved in the collection of scientific data on plant and animal life since 2005 and in cooperation with the park administration, are also involved with the formulation of maintenance and development plans (see Keil 2019).

== Works cited ==
- Diedrich, Lisa. "No Politics, No Park: The Duisburg-Nord Model." Topos: European Landscape Magazine, no. 26 (1999): 69 – 78.
- "Duisburg North Landscape Park." Anthos, 31.3 (1992): 27 – 32.
- Marot, Sebastien, and Architectural Association. Sub-Urbanism and the Art of Memory. London: Architectectural Association, 2003.
- Latz, Peter. "The Idea of Making Time Visible." Topos 33 (2000): 94 - 99. "Landschaftspark Duisburg-Nord."
- Leppert, Stephan. "Peter Latz: Landschaftspark Duisburg-Nord, Germania." Domus, no. 802 (1998): 32 – 37.
- Steinglass, Matt. "The Machine in the Garden." Metropolis 20.2 (2000): 126 – 131, 166 - 167
- Yates, Frances A. "Architecture and the Art of Memory." Architectural Design 38 (December 1968): 573 – 578.
- Weilacher, Udo (2008): Syntax of Landscape. The Landscape Architecture by Peter Latz and Partners. Basel Berlin Boston: Birkhauser Publisher. ISBN 978-3-7643-7615-4
- Technical University of Munich, Chair for Landscape Architecture and Industrial Landscape LAI (Ed.): Learning from Duisburg Nord. München 2009, ISBN 978-3-941370-07-4
- Tate, Alan. "Great City Parks" Spon Press, London, (2001) ISBN 0-419-24420-4
- Keil, Peter (2019): Industrial nature and species diversity in the Landscape Park Duisburg-Nord. – Electronic Publications of the Biological Station of Western Ruhrgebiet 39 (2019): 1‒6.. Available from: [accessed Dec 01 2020].

== See also ==
- List of preserved historic blast furnaces
