= Brøndbyvester =

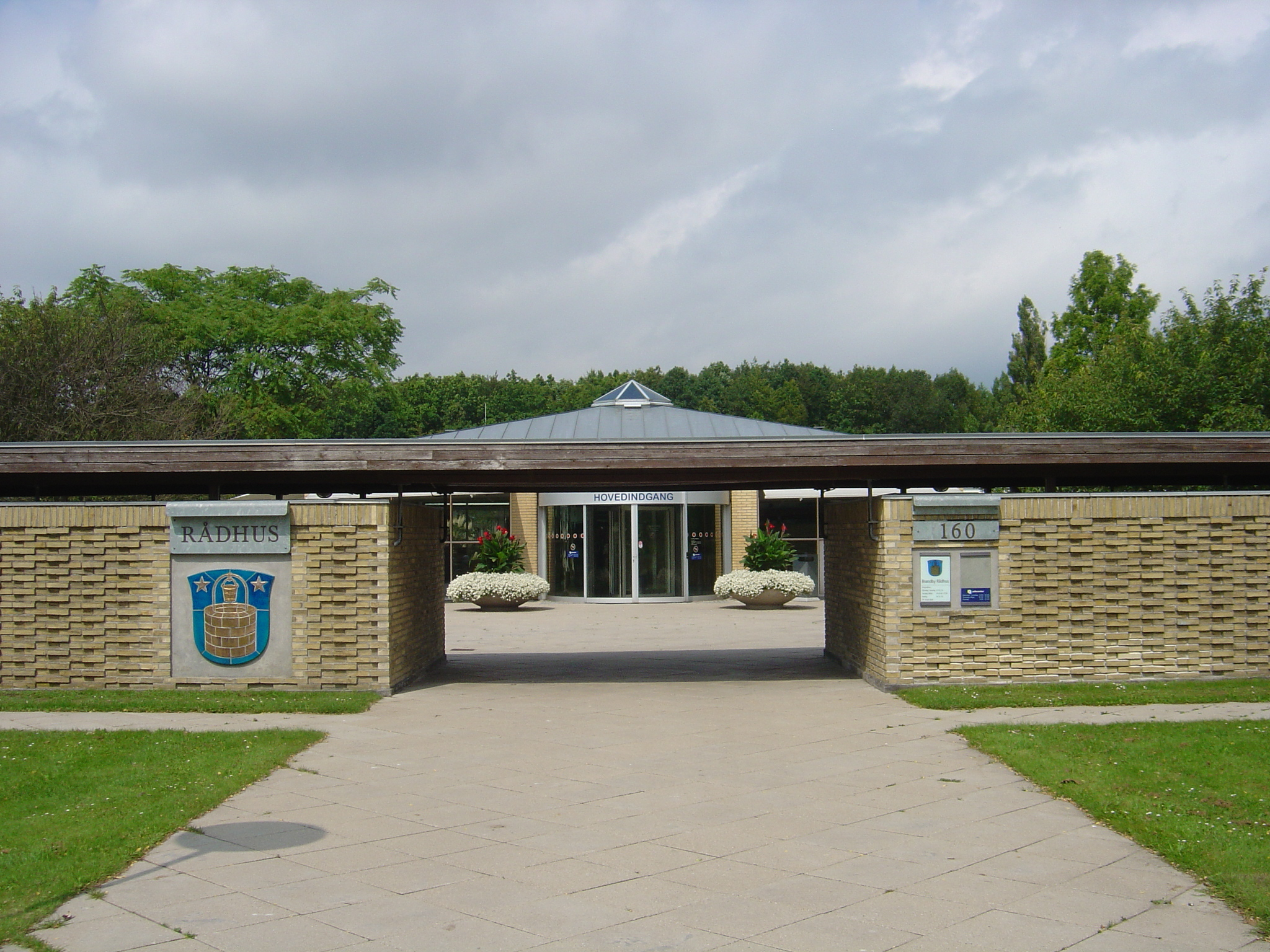
- Brøndby town hall

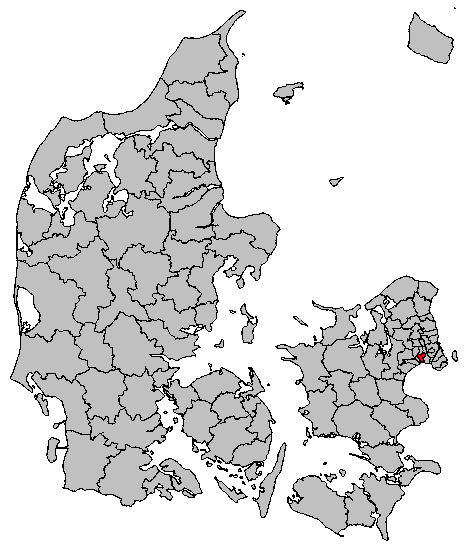
- Coordinates: 55°39′17″N 12°24′19″E
- Country: Denmark
- Region: Capital (Hovedstaden)
- Municipality: Brøndby

Government
  - Mayor: Ib Terp

Population (2009)
  - Total: 20,000
- Time zone: UTC+1 (Central Europe Time)
  - Summer (DST): UTC+2

Brøndbyvester (Danish pronunciation: [pʁɶnpyˈvestɐ]) is a Danish town, seat and main settlement of the Brøndby Municipality, in the Region Hovedstaden. It is known for housing the stadium of football team Brøndby IF.

== History ==
The town is the original core of Brøndby and sometimes is simply named in that way.

== Geography ==
The town is situated close to the coast, in the south-western suburb of Copenhagen and is part of its urban area.

== Notable people ==
- Per Bjerregaard (born 1946 in Randers) a Danish educated physician, former footballer and chairman of Brøndby IF
- Henrik Carlsen (born 1959) a Danish composer, record producer, singer and keyboardist; grew up in Brøndby

=== Sport ===
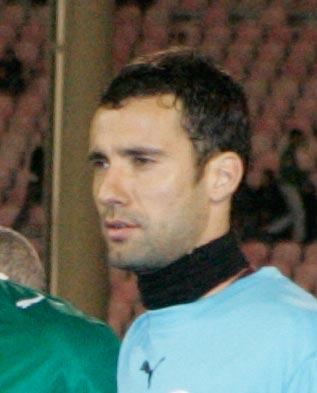
Karim Zaza, 2009

- Erik Rasmussen (born 1960) a former Danish footballer with 450 club caps and a manager
- Morten Cramer (born 1967) a Danish educated police officer, formerly a football goalkeeper
- Karim Zaza (born 1975) a Moroccan retired professional football goalkeeper with 412 club caps
- Helle Nielsen (born 1981) a Danish badminton player
- Anders Jochumsen (born 1981) a former Danish footballer, current assistant manager of BK Frem
- Martin Pedersen (born 1983) a Danish professional road bicycle racer
- Zishan Shah (born 1987) a Danish cricketer
- Mikkel Bødker (born 1989) a Danish ice hockey right winger currently playing for HC Lugano
- Martin Hansen (born 1990) a Danish football goalkeeper for Hannover 96
- Hamid Shah (born 1992) a Danish cricketer
- Andreas Stokbro (born 1997) a Danish cyclist
- Caroline Pleidrup (born 2000) a Danish footballer, plays for Brøndby IF

== See also ==
- Brøndby IF
- Brøndby Strand
- Brøndby Stadium
