= Peter Latz =

Peter Latz may refer to:

- Peter Latz (botanist) (born 1941), Australian agrostologist, botanist, ethnobotanist, and author
- Peter Latz (landscape architect) (born 1939), German landscape architect and a professor
