= Dieter Kienast =

Swiss landscape architect (born 1945)

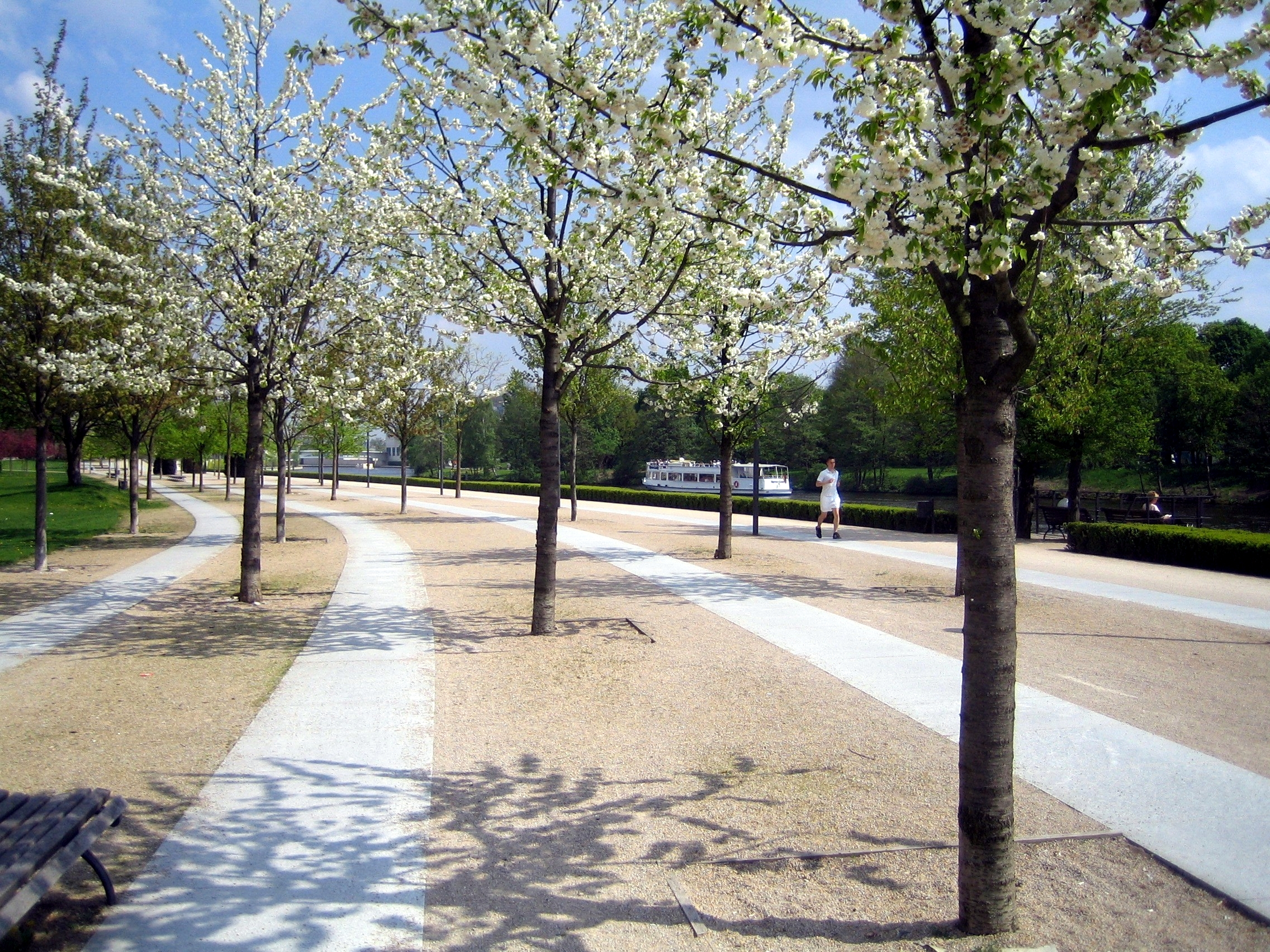
Moabiter Werder, Berlin

Dieter Kienast (30 October 1945 - 23 December 1998) was a Swiss landscape architect and professor.

== Biography ==
Dieter Kienast was born on 30 October 1945 in Zollikon. He grew up as the son of Elisabeth and Heinrich Kienast-Sommerauer in their nursery in Zürich. After finishing school in Zürich, he completed an apprenticeship as a gardener with the Hottinger brothers in Zürich (1962–1965). Kienast practiced with Albert Zulauf in Baden (1966–1967) and with Fred Eicher in Zürich (1969–1970). After beginning his studies in landscape architecture at the Technical University of Munich-Weihenstephan, he studied at the Gesamthochschule Kassel between 1971 and 1975 under Günther Grzimek, Peter Latz, Lucius Burckhardt and Karl Heinrich Hülbusch, among others. In 1978, he completed his doctorate with a phytosociological thesis on ruderal vegetation in cities under Karl Heinrich Hülbusch and became co-owner of the planning office Stöckli Kienast & Koeppel Landschaftsarchitekten in Zürich and Wettingen. From 1981 to 1985, he was technical director of the Botanical Gardens in Brüglingen near Basel. In 1995, together with Günther Vogt, he founded Kienast Vogt Partner Landschaftsarchitekten in Zürich and Bern. The landscape architect died of cancer Zürich in 1998. Kienast taught at the Interkantonales Technikum Rapperswil (1980–1991), the ETH Zurich (1985–1997, 1997–1998) and the University of Karlsruhe (1992–1997). The Tunisian landscape architect Henri Bava succeeded Kienast at the University of Karlsruhe and Christophe Girot succeeded Kienast at ETH Zurich.

== Principal works ==
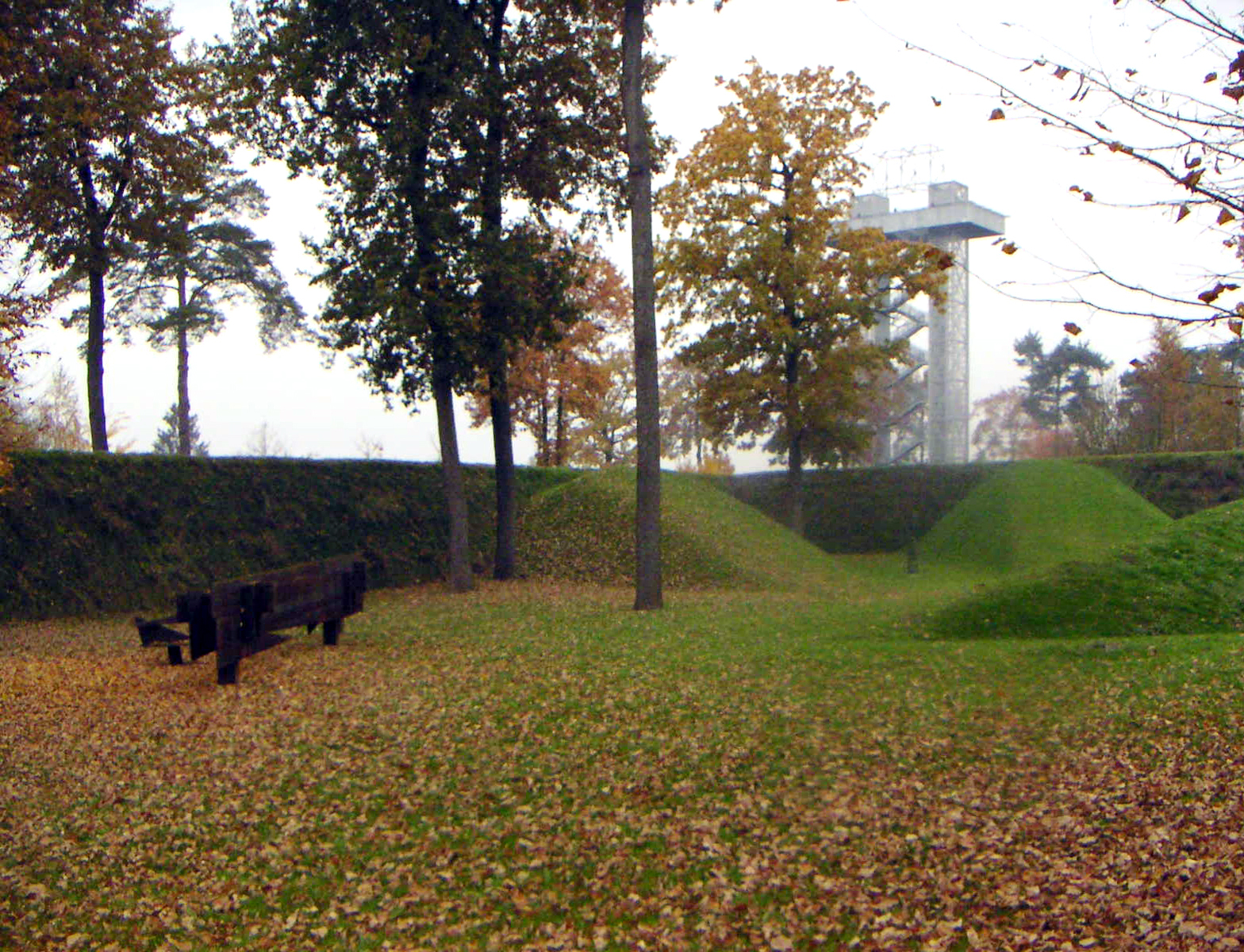
International Garden Show 2000 Styria, Graz

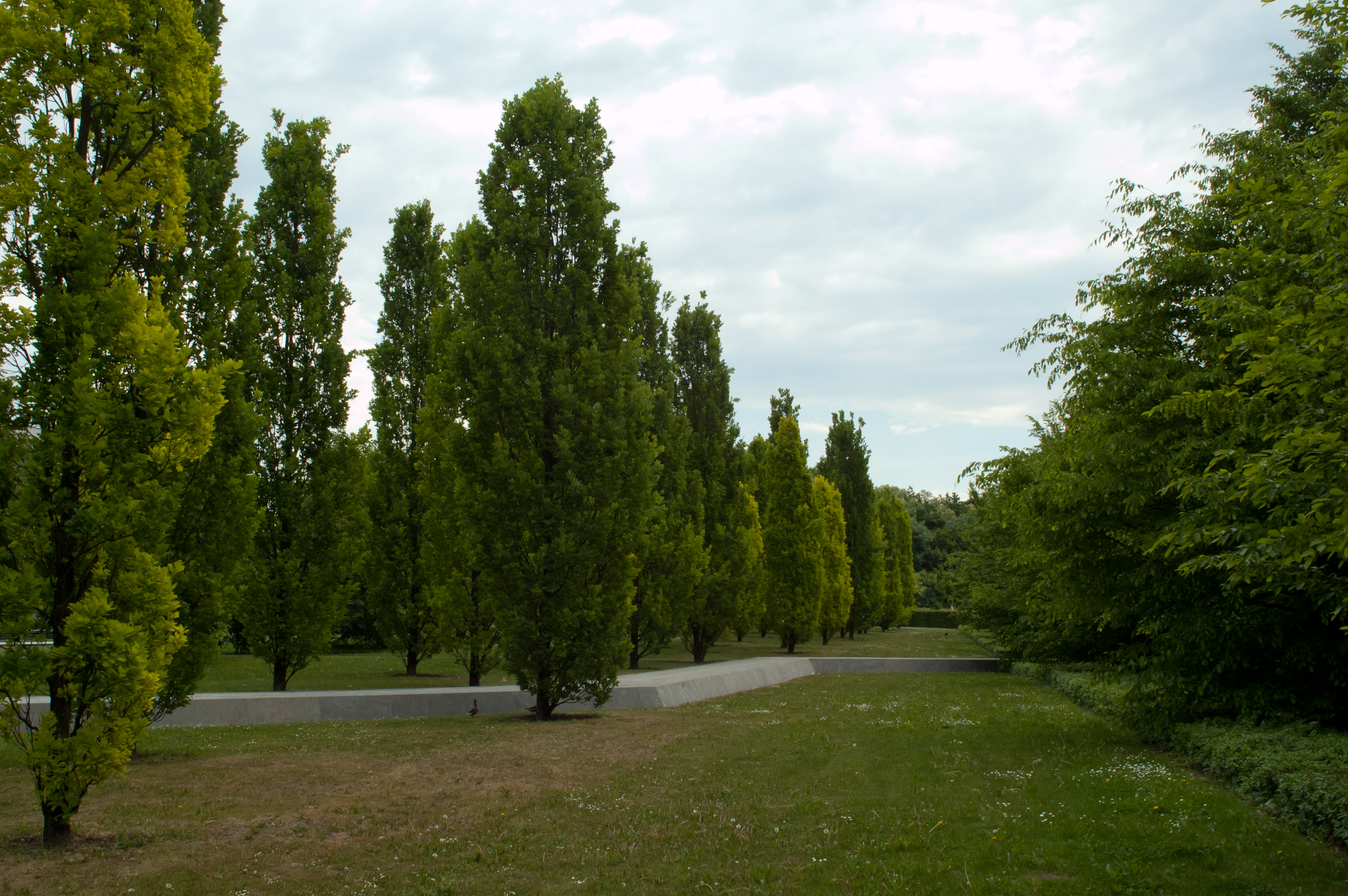
Park at the Federal Labor Court, Erfurt

- 1982: City Park, Wettingen
- 1987–1993: City Park, St. Gallen
- around 1990: Extension of the Günthersburg Park, Frankfurt
- 1991: École cantonale de langue française, Bern
- 1995: Hotel Zürichberg, Zürich
- 1994–1996: Wallmeister house, Ulm with Karljosef Schattner and Wilhelm Huber
- 1994–1997: Spa Park, Bad Münder
- 1995–1997: Center for Art and Media ZKM, Karlsruhe
- 1996–1999: Park of the Federal Labor Court, Erfurt
- 2000: Gardens of the Swiss Embassy, Berlin with Diener & Diener and Helmut Federle
- 1997–2000: International Garden Show 2000 Styria, Graz
- 1994–2000: Masoala Hall in the Zoo Zürich
- 1995–2000: EXPO 2000 and exhibition grounds, Hanover
- 1995–2000: Outdoor areas of the Tate Modern Gallery, London
- 2000–2001: Park on the Bundespräsidenten-Dreieck, Berlin
- 2000–2002: Park on the Moabiter Werder, Berlin

== Former assistants and employees ==
- Maurus Schifferli
- Günther Vogt
- Udo Weilacher
