= Leo Baeck Medal =

- Leo Baeck Medal
- Awarded for: Helping preserve the spirit of German-speaking Jewry in culture, academia, politics, and philanthropy.
- Description: The highest honor bestowed byb the Leo Baeck Institute of New York City
- Sponsored by: Leo Baeck Institute of New York City
- Date: Annually
- Location: New York City
- Country: United States
- Reward: Gold-bronze medal depicting Rabbi Leo Baeck
- First award: 1978; 48 years ago
- Most recent recipient(s): Wolf Blitzer and Kati Marton (2025)
- Website: lbi.org/honors

The Leo Baeck Medal has been awarded since 1978 by the Leo Baeck Institute of New York City, an international research institute devoted to the study of the history and culture of German-speaking Jewry. It is the highest recognition the Institute bestows upon those who have helped preserve the spirit of German-speaking Jewry in culture, academia, politics, and philanthropy.

On the front of the medal is an image of Rabbi Leo Baeck, and the words, "Leader of German Jewry." On the back are the words "so that the memory of a great past may not perish."

== Recipients ==
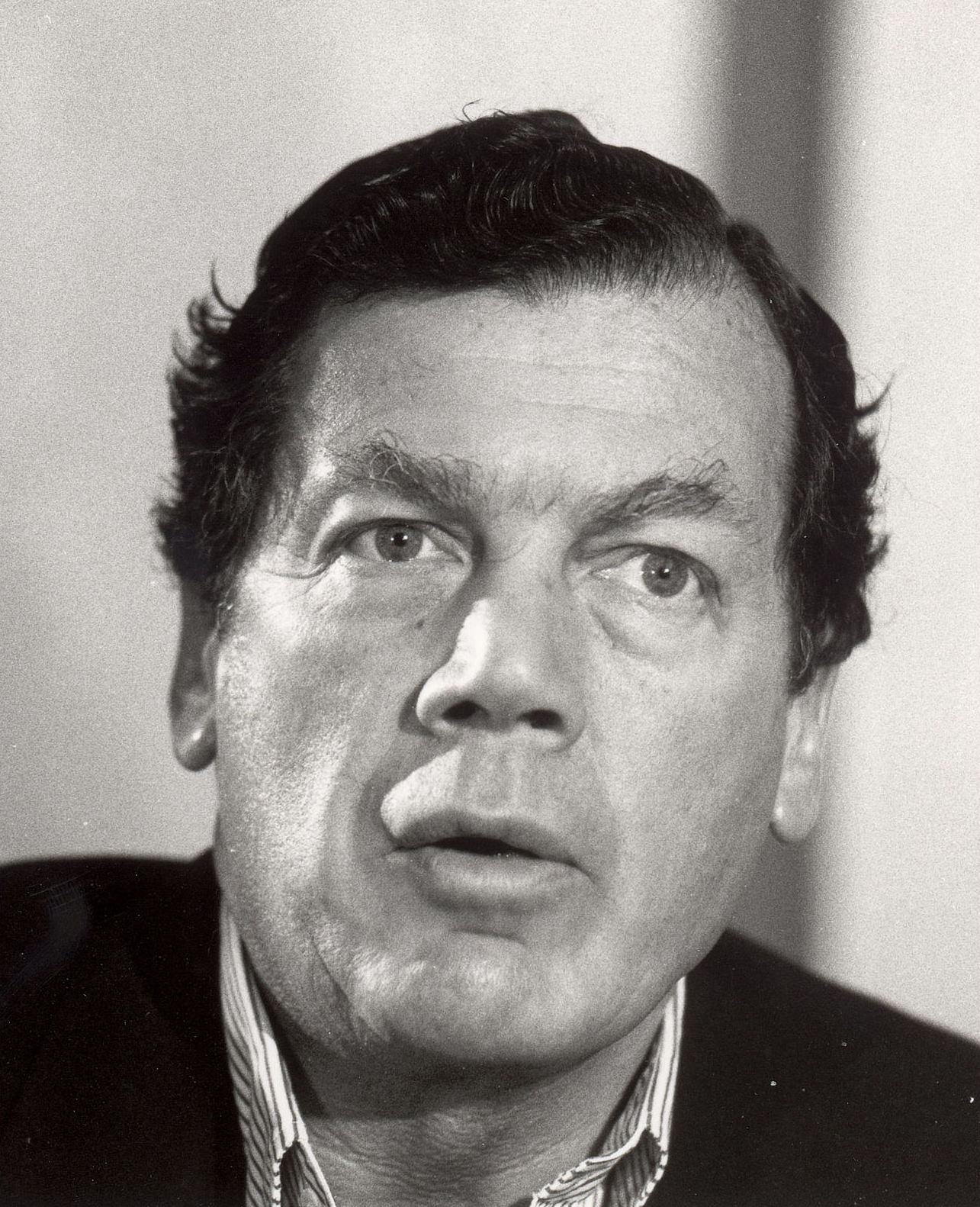
Edgar Bronfman, Sr.

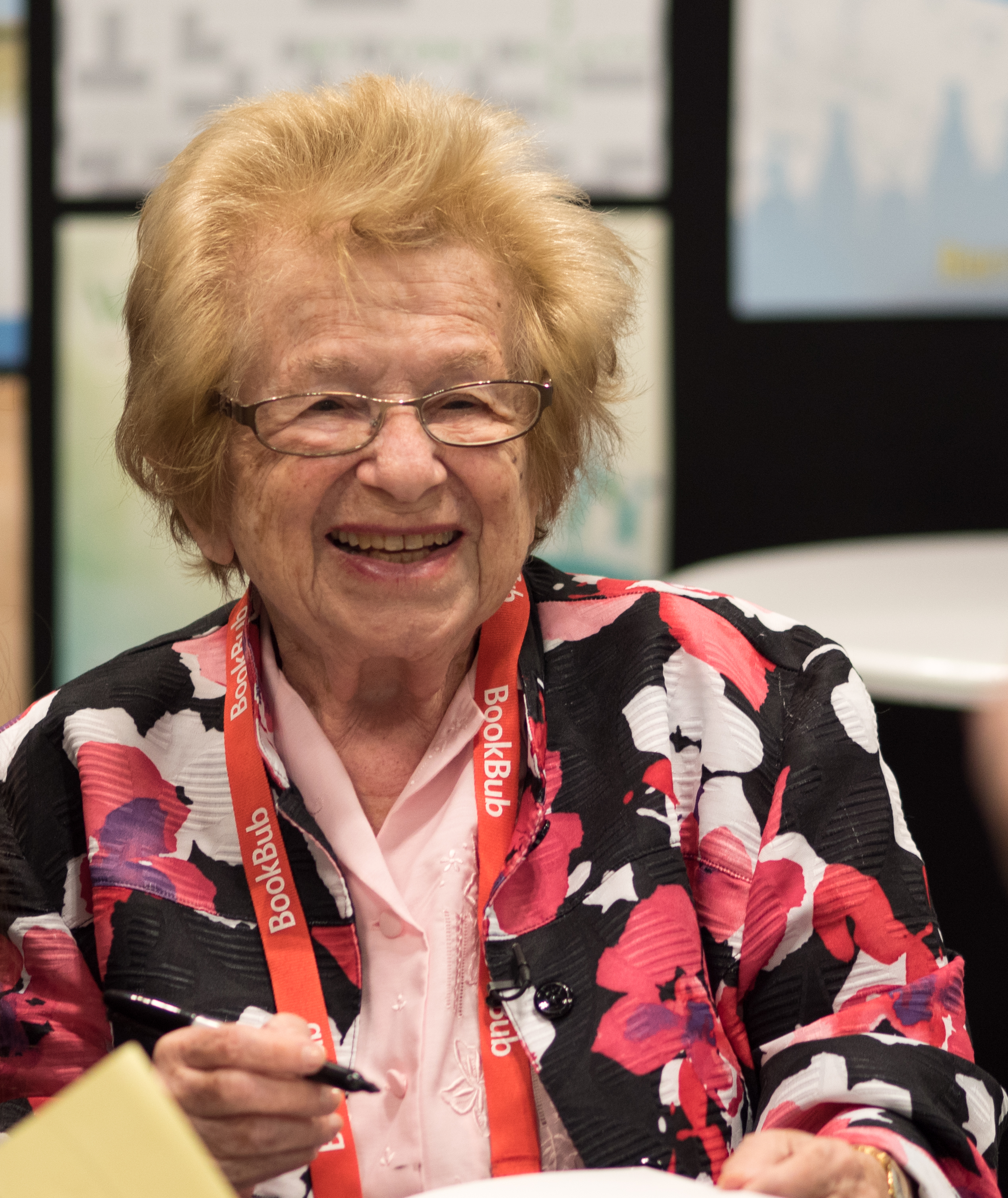
Ruth Westheimer

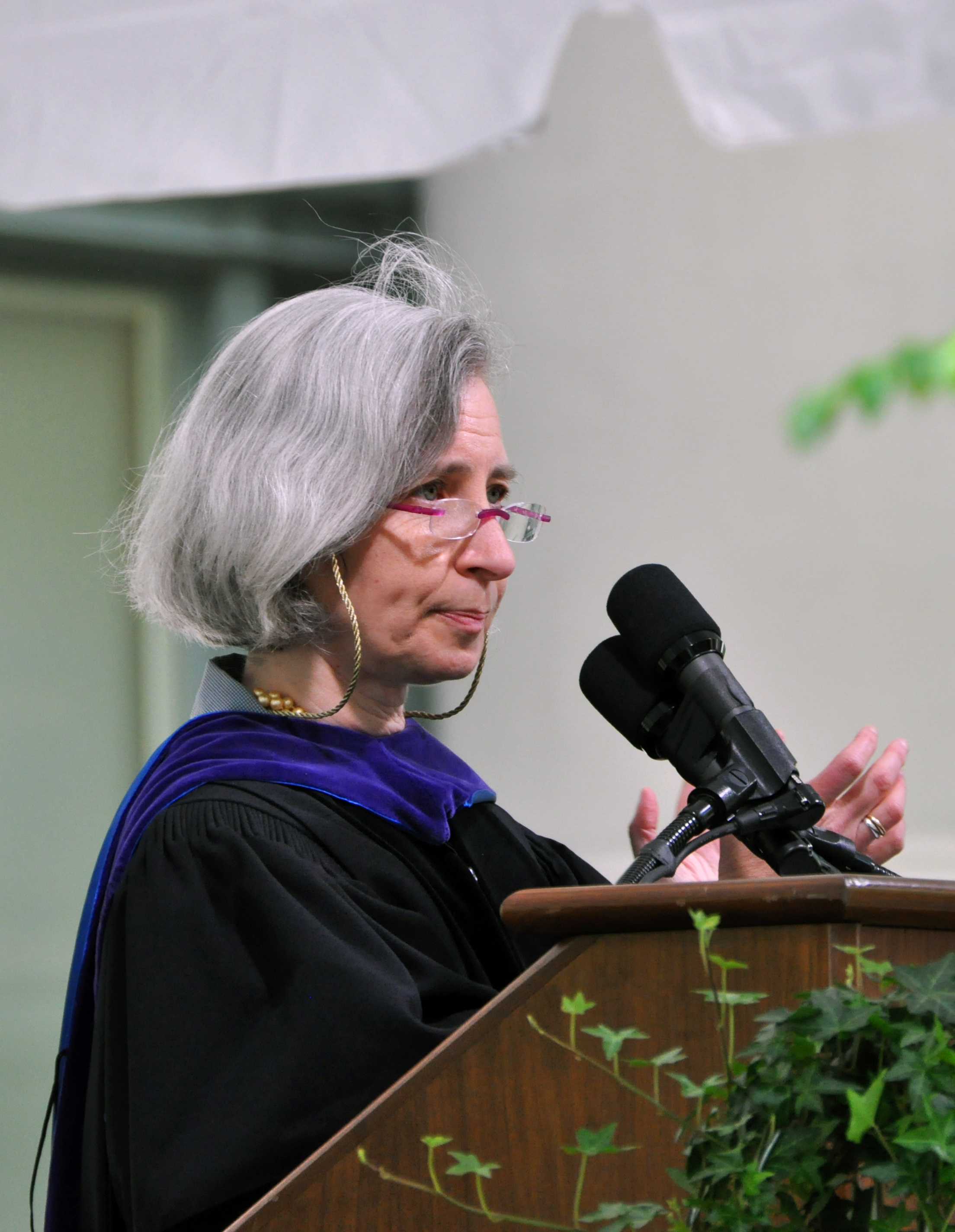
Martha Minow

- 1978 – Axel Springer, publisher, founder of Axel Springer
- 1980 – Fred Lessing, chairman and treasurer of Leo Baeck Institut New York
- 1995 – Fred Grubel, vice president of Leo Baeck Institut New York
- 1996 – Ernst Cramer, German-born American publisher, chairman of Axel Springer
- 1997 – Helmut Sonnenfeldt, German-born American political advisor, member of US National Security Council
- 1998 – George Mosse, German-born American history professor
- 1999 – W. Michael Blumenthal, German-born American director of Jewish Museum Berlin
- 2000 – Edgar Bronfman, Sr., businessman, president of the World Jewish Congress
- 2001 – Johannes Rau, President of Germany
- 2002 – Ruth Westheimer (Dr. Ruth), German-American sex therapist, talk show host, author, professor, Holocaust survivor, and former Haganah sniper.
- 2003 – Daniel Libeskind, architect
- 2004 – Fritz Stern, German-born American historian
- 2005 – Otto Schily, German Minister of the Interior
- 2006 – James Wolfensohn, lawyer, banker, economist, and President of the World Bank
- 2007 – Mathias Döpfner, journalist, CEO of Axel Springer
- 2008 – Wolfgang Ischinger, German ambassador to the UK and USA
- 2009 – Joschka Fischer, Foreign Minister of Germany
- 2010 – Angela Merkel, Chancellor of Germany
- 2010 – Kurt Masur, conductor
- 2011 – Anselm Kiefer, painter and sculptor
- 2012 – Margarethe von Trotta, film director
- 2013 – Stuart Eizenstat, ambassador, U.S. Special Advisor for Holocaust Issues
- 2014 – Joachim Gauck, President of Germany
- 2015 – Ismar Schorsch, German-born American President Emeritus of the Leo Baeck Institut
- 2016 – Robert Morgenthau, lawyer, District Attorney for New York County
- 2017 – Max M. Warburg Jr., German-born American banker
- 2018 – Peter Wittig, German ambassador to the UK and USA, and wife Huberta von Voss-Wittig
- 2019 – Martha Minow, Dean of Harvard Law School
- 2021 – Frank-Walter Steinmeier, President of Germany
- 2022 – Amy Gutmann, United States ambassador to Germany
- 2023 – Mandy Patinkin, Kathryn Grody, Bernie Blum
- 2024 – Shulamit Reinharz, Jehuda Reinharz
- 2025 – Wolf Blitzer, Kati Marton

== Distinction ==
The similarly named Leo Baeck Prize of the Central Council of Jews in Germany is to be distinguished from this medal.
