= Hugh B. Cramer =

American politician

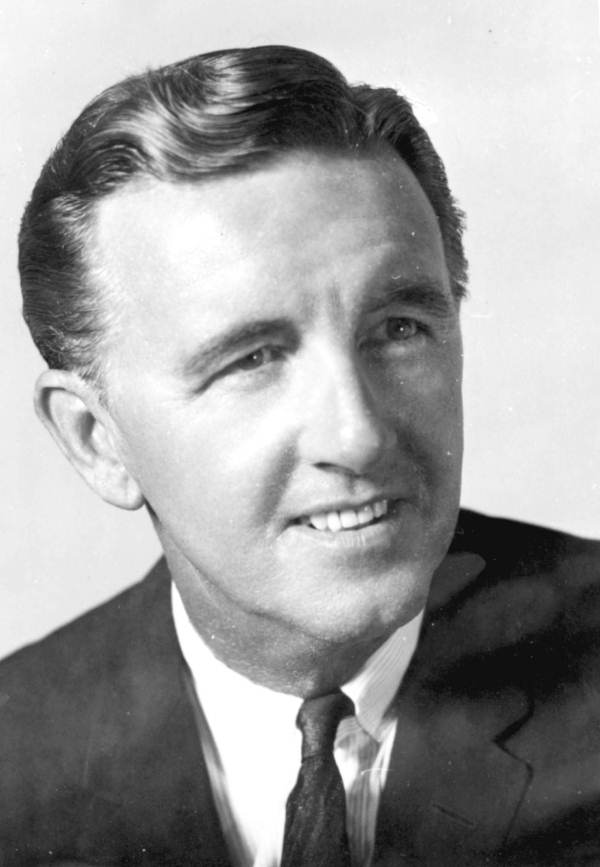
- Cramer in 1966

Member of the Florida House of Representatives from Broward County
- In office 1966–1967

Personal details
- Born: 1915 North Tonawanda, New York, U.S.
- Died: October 25, 2000 (aged 84–85)
- Party: Democratic
- Spouse: Ann Cramer

Hugh B. Cramer (1915 – October 25, 2000) was an American politician. He served as a Democratic member of the Florida House of Representatives.

== Life and career ==
Cramer was born in North Tonawanda, New York.

In 1966, Cramer was elected to the Florida House of Representatives, serving until 1967.

Cramer died in October 2000, at the age of 85.
