= Udo Weilacher =

German landscape architect and academic

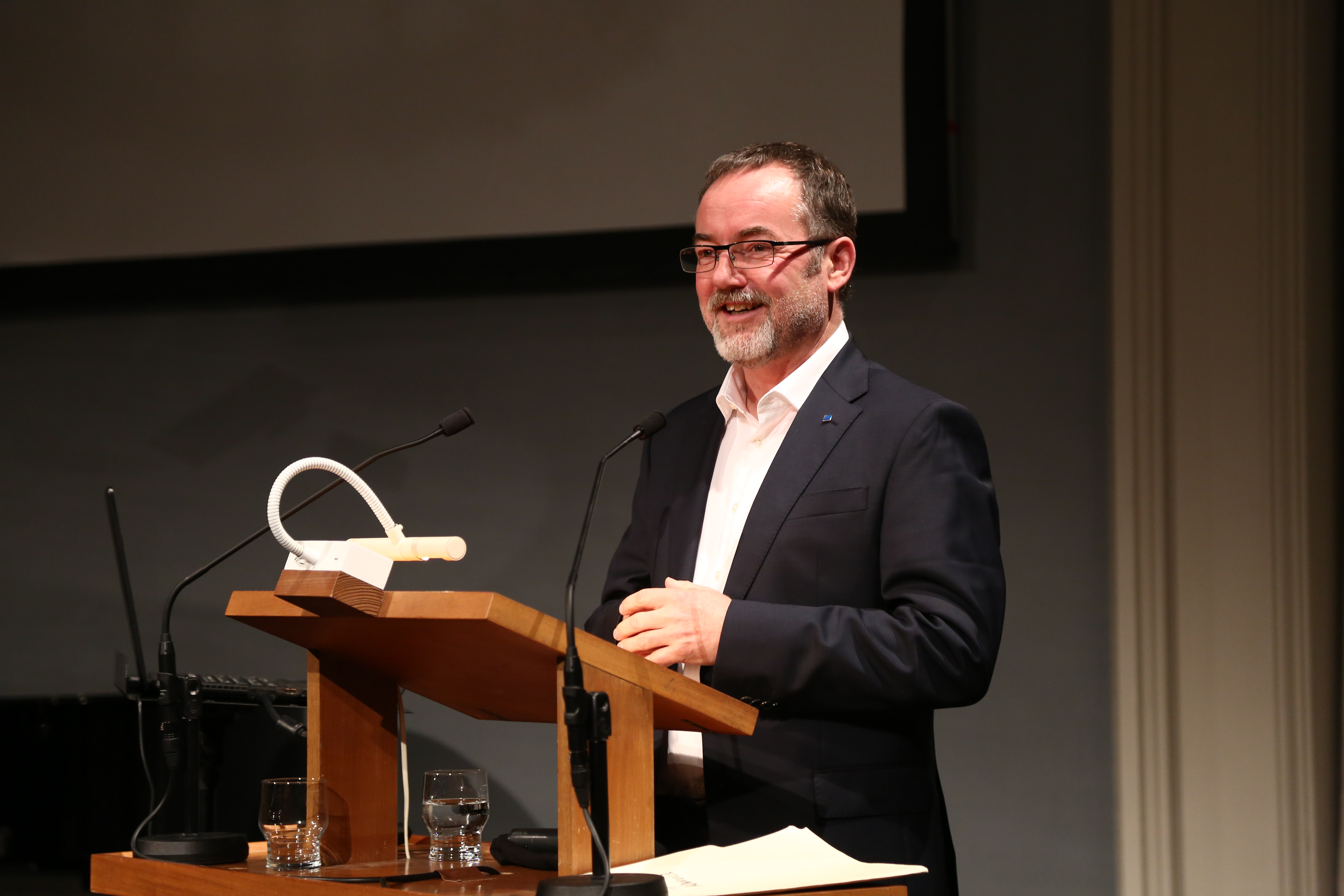
- Born: 1963 (age 62–63); Kaiserslautern, West Germany
- Occupation: Landscape architect
- Known for: Research on relationship between art and landscape; Theory and history of contemporary landscape architecture; Transformation of cultural landscapes

Academic background
- Education: Gardener (1984); Technical University of Munich (Diploma); California State Polytechnic University, Pomona; ETH Zurich (Dr. sc. ETH)

Academic work
- Discipline: Landscape Architecture
- Institutions: University of Karlsruhe; ETH Zurich (scientific assistant, lecturer); Leibniz University Hannover (Professor, Dean); Technical University of Munich (Professor)
- Main interests: Art and landscape; Theory and history of contemporary landscape architecture; Transformation of former cultural landscapes (e.g., industrial landscapes in the Alps)

Udo Weilacher (born 1963 in Kaiserslautern) is a German landscape architect, author and Professor for Landscape Architecture.

== Biography ==
Udo Weilacher was educated as a gardener in 1984. He studied landscape architecture at the Technical University of Munich-Weihenstephan and at the California State Polytechnic University, Pomona between 1986 and 1993. Since 1995, Weilacher has been an officially registered Garden- and Landscape Architect at the Chamber of Architecture in Germany. At the Technical University of Munich he received his diploma from the German landscape architect and professor Peter Latz. He worked with the renowned Swiss landscape architect Dieter Kienast as a scientific assistant and a lecturer at the University of Karlsruhe and the ETH Zurich. Weilacher began his doctoral research at ETH Zurich under Dieter Kienast. Following Kienast’s death in 1998, Arthur Rüegg became the principal examiner, with Peter Latz serving as co-examiner. The dissertation Visionary Gardens. Modern Landscapes by Ernst Cramer (1898–1980) was completed with distinction in 2001.

In 2002 Weilacher became full professor for Landscape Architecture and Design at the Leibniz University Hannover and, in 2006-08, Dean of the Faculty of Architecture and Landscape Sciences. Since April 2009 Udo Weilacher has been a full professor for Landscape Architecture and Transformation at the Technical University of Munich, Department of Architecture, TUM School of Engineering and Design.

Weilacher worked from 1998 to 2002 as a freelance journalist for NZZ FOLIO, the monthly magazine of the Neue Zürcher Zeitung. He published his works internationally, is a member of international juries and scientific advisor in editorial boards of scientific magazines and research institutes.

== Research and writing ==
Weilacher’s research focuses on the relationship between landscape architecture and the visual arts, the theory and history of twentieth-century and contemporary landscape architecture, and the transformation of cultural and post-industrial landscapes. His early research examined the relationship between Land Art and landscape architectural design. This work resulted in Between Landscape Architecture and Land Art, published 1996 in German and English editions.

A further focus of his research has been the history and theory of modern landscape architecture, including the work of Ernst Cramer, Dieter Kienast and Peter Latz. His doctoral dissertation at ETH Zurich examined the work of Swiss landscape architect Ernst Cramer. In Syntax of Landscape (2008), Weilacher analyzed the work of Peter Latz and Partners, including the transformation of post-industrial sites such as Landschaftspark Duisburg-Nord and Parco Dora in Turin. The book received the John Brinckerhoff Jackson Book Prize from the Foundation for Landscape Studies in 2011. In 2017, Weilacher was a Mellon Senior Practitioner Resident in Garden and Landscape Studies at Dumbarton Oaks, Harvard University. During the residency, his research focused on structuralism in international architecture and landscape architecture.

At the Technical University of Munich, Weilacher’s research increasingly addressed the transformation of industrial and urban landscapes. From 2018 to 2021, he led the TUM contribution to trAILs – Transformation of Alpine Industrial Landscapes, an international Alpine Space research project concerned with the sustainable transformation of former industrial sites in Alpine regions. The Technical University of Munich was lead partner of the project, worked with four pilot regions and developed a WebGIS, an assessment tool, co-design procedures and learning modules for the transformation of industrial brownfields.

More recent collaborative research has addressed the transformation and climate adaptation of vulnerable waterway, urban and coastal landscapes. Research on the Nile Delta examined landscape-based regeneration of waterways in response to water scarcity and environmental degradation. In collaborative research with Sara S. Fouad and earth and planetary scientist Essam Heggy, Weilacher investigated the transformation of Alexandria’s urban waterways and their potential role in climate adaptation. In 2025, this research was extended to hydroclimatic risks affecting buildings and infrastructure along the southern Mediterranean coast and to adaptive landscape mitigation strategies.

== Academic Memberships ==
Udo Weilacher is or was a member of national and international scientific and professional organizations:

- BDLA, German Association of Landscape Architects
- DGGL, German Society of Garden Architecture and Landscape Culture
- CGL, Centre of Garden Art and Landscape Architecture at the Leibniz University Hannover
- Deutscher Werkbund, German Association of Craftsmen
- International Doctoral College "Spatial Research Lab"

== Honors and awards ==
- 1990 Special Recognition by the California State Polytechnic University, Pomona for excellent program achievement
- 1995 Schinkel-Award in Germany for outstanding landscape design project
- 1996 Peter Joseph Lenné-Award in Germany for outstanding landscape design project
- 2001 Medal of the ETH Zurich for outstanding dissertation
- 2011 John Brinckerhoff Jackson Book Prize by the Foundation of Landscape Studies in New York for the book Syntax of Landscape. The Landscape Architecture by Peter Latz und Partners
- 2017 Mellon Practitioner Resident at Dumbarton Oaks Research Library and Collection, Washington, D.C.

== Publications (selection) ==
- Weilacher, Udo (1996/1999): Between Landscape Architecture and Land Art. Basel Berlin Boston: Birkhauser; ISBN 3-7643-6119-0
- Weilacher, Udo (2005): Visionary Gardens. Modern Landscapes by Ernst Cramer. Basel Berlin Boston: Birkhauser; ISBN 3-7643-6567-6
- Weilacher, Udo (2005): In Gardens. Profiles of contemporary European Landscape Architecture. Basel Berlin Boston: Birkhauser; ISBN 3-7643-7084-X
- Udo Weilacher (2007): The Garden as the Last Luxury Today: Thought-Provoking Garden Projects by Dieter Kienast. in: Conan, Michel (ed.): Contemporary Garden Aesthetics, Creations and Interpretations. 81-95. Harvard University Press ISBN 0-88402-325-7
- Weilacher, Udo (2008): Syntax of Landscape. The Landscape Architecture by Peter Latz and Partners. Basel Berlin Boston: Birkhauser; ISBN 978-3-7643-7615-4
- Weilacher, Udo (2020): Garden Thinking in Cities of Tomorrow. in: SPOOL. Journal of Architecture and the Built Environment, vol. 6; doi:https://doi.org/10.7480/spool.2020.1.5484
- Weilacher, Udo et al. (2023): Waterways transformation in the vulnerable port city of Alexandria. in: Cities, vol. 141, Oct. 2023; doi:https://doi.org/10.1016/j.cities.2023.104426
