= Lea-Sophie Cramer =

German entrepreneur

- Born: 16 April 1987 (age 39); Berlin, Germany
- Education: University of Mannheim

Lea-Sophie Cramer (born 16 April 1987 in Berlin) is a German entrepreneur. In 2013 she founded Amorelie together with Sebastian Pollok. Amorelie currently employs 140 people in Berlin and is active in 15 markets. In 2017, the company achieved sales of 56 million euros. On 1 January 2020, she switched to the company's advisory board.

In 2014 she founded the venture capital fund Starstrike Ventures GmbH with other business angels. She is also a member of the board of directors at Conrad Electronic.

Cramer was named a "role model entrepreneur" by the Federal Ministry of Economics and was voted into the Capital "40 under 40" and Forbes "30 under 30" as the leading young entrepreneur in Europe. She is a member of the Young Digital Economy Advisory Board at the Federal Ministry of Economics

== Life ==
Cramer graduated in 2009 her studies in business administration at the University of Mannheim and started as a consultant at the Boston Consulting Group before when Internet GmbH Rocket and the discount coupon site Groupon got in. At Groupon, as Vice President International, she managed the Asian market with 11 countries and 1200 employees.

In 2013, she and Sebastian Pollok founded the e-commerce start-up Amorelie in Berlin, an online shop for love life. Amorelie achieved sales of 56 million euros in 2017. The company employs over 140 people and is active in 15 markets. Together with other business angels, Lea-Sophie Cramer founded Starstrike Ventures GmbH in 2014 to pass on her founding experience and to invest in young startups. In the same year she was appointed to the board of directors of Conrad Electronic.

Cramer is a jury member of the second and third season of the Pro7 entertainment show " Das Ding des Jahres ".

== Private ==
Cramer is the mother of two children and lives with her partner in Berlin.
