= Karl von Crämer =

Bavarian politician (1818–1902)

Karl von Crämer (1818–1902), Bavarian politician, had a very remarkable career, rising gradually from a mere workman in a factory at Doos near Nuremberg to the post of manager, and finally becoming part proprietor of the establishment. Leaving business in 1870 he devoted his time entirely to politics.

From 1848 he had been a member of the Bavarian second chamber, at first representing the district of Erlangen-Fürth, and afterwards Nuremberg, which city also sent him after the war of 1866 as its deputy to the German customs parliament, and from 1871 to 1874 to the first German Reichstag. He sat in these bodies as a member of the Progressive party (Fortschrittspartei), and in Bavaria was one of the leaders of the Liberal (Freisinnige) party. His eloquence had a great hold upon the masses. As a parliamentarian he was very clear-headed, and thoroughly understood how to lead a party. For many years he was the reporter of the finance committee of the chamber. In 1882, on account of his great services in connection with the Bavarian National Exhibition of Nuremberg, the order of the crown of Bavaria was conferred upon him, carrying with it the honor of nobility. He died at Nuremberg on 31 December 1902.
