= Ernst Cramer (architect) =

Ernst (Friedrich) Cramer (December 7, 1898 (Zürich/ Switzerland) – September 7, 1980) (Rüschlikon/ Switzerland) was a Swiss landscape architect and one of the most renowned European garden architects after 1945, who had a strong influence on present-day landscape architecture in Europe.

== Biography ==
Ernst Cramer learned the profession of a gardener at a renowned firm in Zürich, where he was instructed by the landscape architect Gustav Ammann, a close friend of Richard Neutra and one of the most important Swiss garden architects at the time. When Cramer started his own business in 1929, he mostly designed private gardens for wealthy clients and perfected a romantic, rather picturesque style. He was especially interested in the rustic gardens that were built in the southern part of Switzerland in the canton of Ticino.

Cramer was a member of the Zürich section of the Werkbund, headed by the Bauhaus member Johannes Itten and the Swiss sculptor Max Bill, and became more and more interested in a modern method of garden design. About 1950 Cramer dramatically changed his style and started designing modern architectural gardens. His friendship and cooperation with many modern Swiss artists and his strong interest in modern architecture reinforced his will to find a new language in garden architecture. In particular, the temporary exhibition projects of Cramer are among the most remarkable creations of modern garden architecture in Europe. Most impressive were his contributions to national and international garden exhibitions, for example, the first national garden show in Zürich G|59 (1959) and the IGA international garden exhibition in Hamburg (1963). The abstract basic conception of his gardens, the renunciation of superfluous decoration, and the use of concrete and geometrically shaped elements caused considerable irritation among his professional colleagues and added to his international reputation.

Cramer's Garten des Poeten (Poet's Garden), built 1959 for the G59 - 1st Swiss Horticulture Exhibition shown in Zürich, was portrayed by Elizabeth B. Kassler in her classic book Modern Gardens and the Landscape, (MOMA 1964). This garden was probably the most important work in Cramer's professional career. At the age of 61 the garden architect had been asked to design a poet's garden for the first national garden show in Switzerland. He worked with minimal means and maximum abstraction instead of imitating nature. Kassler described the design: ”Triangular earth mounds and a stepped cone were precisely edged, grass-sheathed, and doubled by a still pool. The garden was not so much a garden as a sculpture to walk through, abstract earth shapes independent of place, with sharp arises foreign to the nature of their material.” Just a few years later a new radical form of art called Land Art or Earthworks came on the U.S. art scene, creating impressive, almost archaic geometrical earth sculptures, which are among the most important sources of inspiration for present-day landscape architects.

Many other remarkable projects by Ernst Cramer built in close cooperation with some of the most important Swiss modern architects and two gardens designed for houses by Richard Neutra do still exist. Among Cramer's clients were some of the most influential Swiss families, as well as companies such as Roche Chemicals and Ciba Chemical Industries. With his remarkable life's work Cramer not only prepared the ground for an intensive discussion about the contemporary influence of minimalist art and Land Art on landscape architecture. With his courageous gardens he also helped shape the profile of modern Swiss landscape architecture and strongly influenced the work of young successors such as Willi Neukom, Fred Eicher, and Dieter Kienast from Switzerland.

== Selected commissions ==
- 1933 Garden Vogel-Sulzer (rustic garden style), Itschnach, Zürich canton, Switzerland
- 1945-1948 Garden Göhner (rustic garden style), Morcote, Ticino canton, Switzerland
- 1955-1959 School Bernarda, Menzingen, Zug, Switzerland
- 1957 Gardens for the International Building Exhibition "Interbau", Berlin, Germany
- 1959 Garten des Poeten (Poet's Garden), garden exhibition G|59, Zürich, Switzerland
- 1963 Theatergarten (Theater Garden), International Garden Exhibition IGA, Hamburg, Germany
- 1964-1966 Public place, Sulzer office building, Winterthur, Zürich canton, Switzerland
- 1965 Garden for the Casa Ebelin Bucerius (with architect Richard Neutra), Brione, Ticino canton, Switzerland
- 1965 Garden for Haus Rentsch (with architect Richard Neutra), Wengen, Bern canton, Switzerland
- 1968-1972 Open space design for Bruderholzspital hospital, near Basel, Switzerland
- 1972-1978 Public space design for central Post- and Administration building, Vaduz, Liechtenstein
- 1974-1978 Open spaces for Roche chemical industry, Sisseln, Switzerland

== Literature ==
- Weilacher, Udo: Visionary Gardens. Modern Landscapes by Ernst Cramer. Basel: Birkhäuser, 2001, 287 p. ISBN 3-7643-6567-6
- Garten des Poeten: G59 / 2009. Textbuch zur Ausstellung im Architekturforum Zürich, April 2009. Texte von Stefan Rotzler et al. Zürich: Architekturforum Zürich, 2009. 88 p. ISBN 978-3-033-01985-0
