= Peter Latz (landscape architect) =

German landscape architect

Peter Latz (born 1939) is a German landscape architect and a professor for landscape architecture at the Technical University of Munich. He is best known for his emphasis on reclamation and conversion of former industrialized landscapes. Retired today, he was an adjunct professor at the University of Pennsylvania in Philadelphia and was also a visiting professor at the Harvard Graduate School of Design.

Latz once noted in a foreword for the book Visionary Gardens by Ernst Cramer that the overall of landscape architecture could be applied in abstract rules. "The beauty of nature lies within the essence and effect of plants and materials."

== Early life and education ==
Peter Latz was born in Darmstadt and grew up in the Saarland as the son of Heinrich Latz, a German architect. After graduating from high-school he studied landscape architecture at the Technical University in Munich, and after taking his diploma in 1964, he joined the four year post-graduate education in town planning at the Institute of Urban Development and Regional Planning at the RWTH Aachen.

== Career ==
Peter Latz and his wife, Anneliese, founded their landscape architecture office in Aachen and in 1968 in Saarbrücken under the name Latz + Partner. Another firm for urban planning, system planning and landscape planning was set up and run between 1970 and 1976 in cooperation with fellow architect Conny Schmitz. Latz continues to practice landscape architecture and town planning, working with groups of architects, sociologists, and economists.

Latz started teaching in 1968 as a lecturer at the Limburgse Akademie voor Bouwkunst (Limburg Academy of Architecture) in Maastricht. He became a full-time professor for landscape architecture at the Gesamthochschule Kassel in 1973 and was appointed as a professor at the Landscape Architecture and Landscape Planning Department at the Technical University of Munich in 1983 where he retired in 2008.

Among his best known projects is the Landschaftspark Duisburg-Nord in the Ruhr region of Germany. The site of 230 hectares was formerly a very large steel mill. When it became derelict, Latz + Partner, the firm was commissioned to design the park after winning an international design competition with the master plan for the whole site in 1991. They decided to keep the main structures and to incorporate them into a postmodern landscape design. A series of gardens were planted within and around the ruins with the use of the traditional horticulture. Clipped hedges, knot gardens, parterres, bosquets and rose gardens had created a juxtaposition between this formal garden that is situated within a post-industrial site. Duisburg-Nord was a successful landscape garden because Latz had altered the relationship that humans had with the existing site. Because of this project Peter Latz is considered to be, along with American landscape architect Richard Haag, one of the international pioneers for the reclamation and conversion of former industrialized landscapes.

The philosophy of his Latz + Partner firm focuses not only on quality but also on the technical competence and the know-how. Since the 1980s, the firm begins to gear towards the metamorphosis of postindustrial sites.

== Awards ==
- 2014 Friedrich-Ludwig-von-Sckell-Ring awarded by The Bavarian Academy of Fine Arts
- 2013 TOPOS Landscape Award – The International Review of Landscape Architecture and Urban Design honours Peter Latz "for his internationally recognised life's work"
- 2010 Green Good Design Award for being "a leader, pioneer, and innovator in Green Design"
- 2005 Place Planning Award of the Environmental Design Research Association in Edmond, USA
- 2001 Grande Médaille d'Urbanisme by the Académie d'architecture in Paris
- 2000 First European Prize for Landscape Architecture Rosa Barba in Barcelona for the design of Landschaftspark Duisburg-Nord

== Projects ==
Selected projects, chronologically.

- University of Marburg on Lahnberge, Germany (1976–1980)
- University Hospital Marburg on Lahnberge (1976–1985)
- de:Bürgerpark Hafeninsel, Saarbrücken (1980–1989)
- BUGA (de:Bundesgartenschau, the German national garden show): BUGA Berlin 1985, 5 gardens for the "Green Houses" in Berlin – Britz (1981–1985)
- Technical University of Munich, Institute for Landscape and Botany (1986–1988)
- Science City Ulm on the Eselsberg, University Section West (1988-2001)
- European Town Luxembourg, Plateau de Kirchberg (since 1990)
- Greenbelt Frankfurt, Frankfurt am Main (1990–1992)
- Landschaftspark Duisburg-Nord (1990–2001)
- Atelier "Latz + Partner", house and garden in Ampertshausen near Kranzberg (1991 until today)
- Pedestrian zone in Melsungen (1996)
- Granta Park, Cambridge, UK (1997)
- Jardin de brume, Festival International des Jardins, Chaumont-sur-Loire, France (1998)
- Environmental remediation of the Hiriya Landfill and creation of the Ariel Sharon Park, Tel Aviv, Israel (since 2004)
- Parco Dora, Turin, Italy (2004–2012)
- Peter Latz Mastergarden, Beijing, China (2012–2013)

== Literature ==
- Technical University of Munich, Chair for Landscape Architecture and Industrial Landscape LAI (Ed.): Learning from Duisburg Nord. München 2009, ISBN 978-3-941370-07-4
- Weilacher, Udo (2008). Syntax of Landscape. The Landscape Architecture by Peter Latz and Partners. Basel Berlin Boston: Birkhauser Publisher. ISBN 978-3-7643-7615-4
- Peter Latz: The metamorphosis of an industrial site. in: Niall Kirkwood (Ed.): Manufactured Sites London/New York 2001
- Cramer, Ernst. Visionary Gardens: Modern Landscapes (Berlin: Birkauser) 9-11.
- Latz, Peter. The Matamorphosis of an Industrial Site in: Niall Kirkwood (Ed.):Manufactured Sites: Re-thinkining the Post-Industrial Landscape.(London: Spoon Press, 2001).
- Rosenberg, Elissa. (Ed.)Sanda Iliescu. The hand and the soul: aesthetics and ethics in architecture and art (Charlottesville: University of Virginia Press, 2009).
- Turner, Tom. Garden History: Philosophy and Design 2000 BC-2000 AD (New York: Spoon Press, 2005) 273-275.
- Weilacher, Udo. Syntax of Landscape. The Landscape Architecture by Peter Latz and Partners. (Basel Berlin Boston: Birkhauser Publisher).
- "Landschaftspark Duisburg Nord, Duisburg, Germany". Design Observer. 2 December 2010.
