= Ernst Cramer (politician) =

Dutch politician (born 1960)

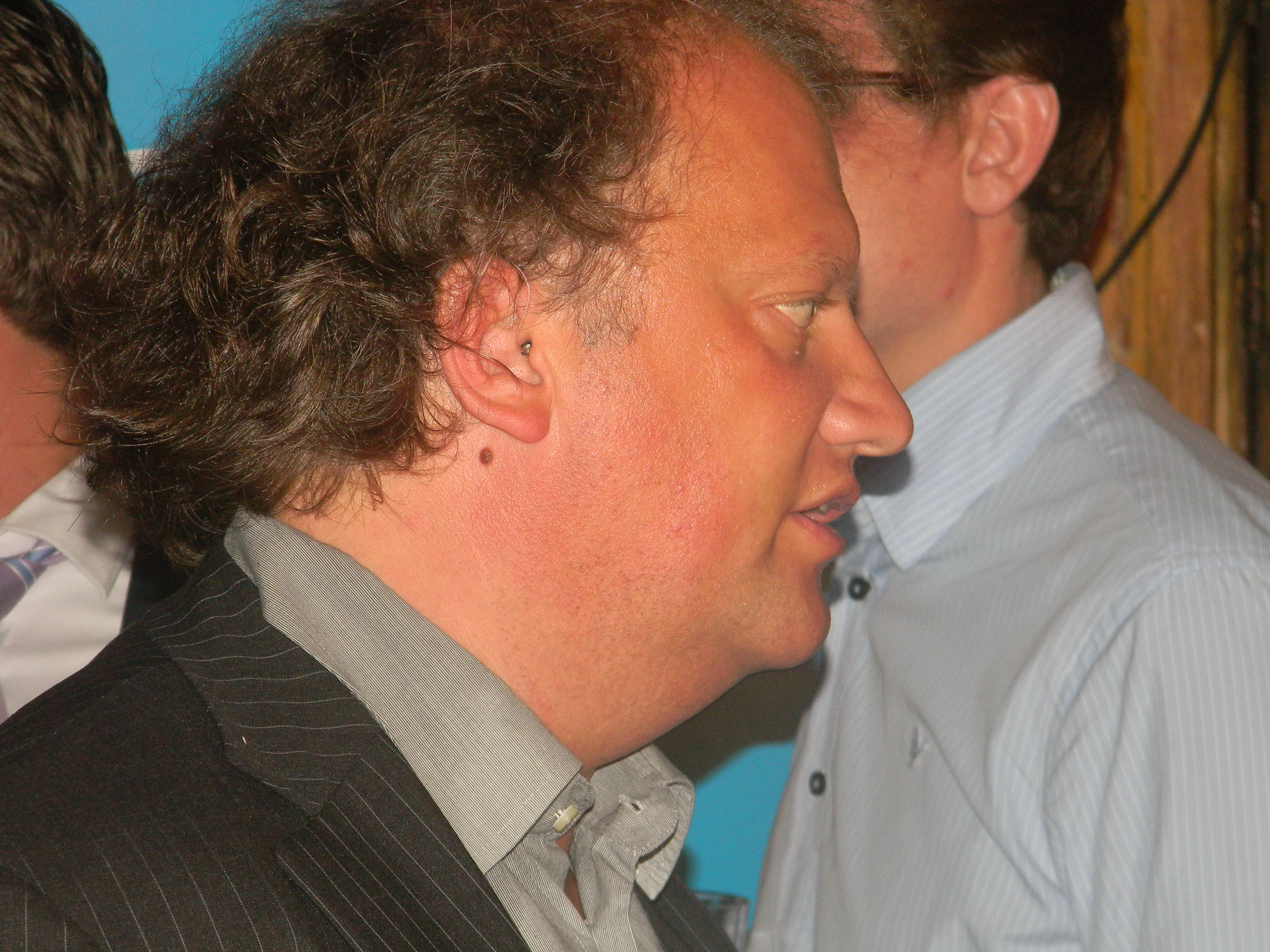
Ernst Cramer

Ernst Ariël (Ernst) Cramer (born 26 June 1960 in Amersfoort) is a former Dutch politician. He is a member of the ChristianUnion (ChristenUnie) and a former member of the House of Representatives of the Netherlands.

Cramer was a member of the city council as well as an alderman of Zeewolde for the Reformed Political League (Gereformeerd Politiek Verbond) and later its successor the ChristianUnion. From 2006 until 2010 he was an MP.

Ernst Cramer is a member of the Reformed Churches in the Netherlands (Liberated) and lives in Woerden.
