= Morten Cramer =

Danish educated police officer (born 1967)

Personal information
- Full name: Morten Cramer
- Date of birth: 7 November 1967 (age 58)
- Place of birth: Brøndby
- Position: Goalkeeper

Team information
- Current team: BK Frem (goalkeeper coach)

Senior career*
Years	Team	Apps	(Gls)
1986–1988	Brøndby IF	28	(0)
1999–2001	Brøndby IF	1	(0)
2001–2006	Herfølge BK	152	(0)
2006–2008	Brøndby IF	1	(0)

International career
1987	Denmark u-21	1	(0)

Managerial career
- 2008–2011: Brøndby IF (Goalkeeper Coach)
- 2013–: BK Frem (Goalkeeper Coach)
- * Club domestic league appearances and goals

Morten Cramer (born 7 November 1967), is a Danish educated police officer, who formerly played professional football (soccer) as a goalkeeper at BK Frem in the Danish Second Division. He has played one national youth team match for the Denmark national under-21 football team.

Cramer started his career at Brøndby IF, where he played a number of games, among them matches in the 1986 European Cup against Budapest Honvéd FC and Dynamo Berlin. However, Cramer would stand in the shadow of later Denmark national football team captain Peter Schmeichel who arrived at the club in 1987. He went on to play for lower league clubs in 1989 and Cramer stopped his professional footballing career to concentrate on his career as a police man.

He played part-time at Roskilde B 06, Fremad Amager and Ølstykke FC until December 1999. He was brought back to Brøndby under coach Åge Hareide, after a ten-year absence from top-flight football. At 32 years of age, he would again be the second in line, this time in favour of the four-years older Mogens Krogh. When Krogh was eventually injured for smaller durations of time, Cramer would see the thirteen-years younger goalkeeper Kim Drejs chosen to fill in the position before him, with yet another youngster Casper Ankergren waiting in the wings. Morten Cramer left Brøndby on a free transfer in July 2001, having played one match since his comeback, for a then combined 20 matches in his time for Brøndby.

He switched to fellow Danish Superliga team Herfølge BK where he established himself as the first-choice keeper, despite Herfølge's relegation to the Danish 1st Division in 2005. In August 2006, he returned to Brøndby IF on a three-year contract as a back-up for Casper Ankergren.
