= Ernst Cramer (journalist) =

German opinion journalist

Ernst J. Cramer (* January 28, 1913 in Augsburg; † January 19, 2010 in Berlin) was a Germany-born publisher and Chairman of the Board of the Axel-Springer-Foundation.

== Life ==
His father Martin was an entrepreneur who lost his fortune during the Great Depression which is why Ernst could not finish highschool. Instead of becoming a teacher, Ernst had to work to support the family. A co-founder 1933 of a Zionist youth movement, Ernst was arrested after the Night of Broken Glass and incarcerated for six weeks in Buchenwald. Thanks to a U.S. visa, he managed to emigrate in 1939 to the United States. His brother and parents were killed in the Shoa. Ernst returned to Buchenwald as a U.S. soldier.

He was honored with numerous awards.

== Honors ==
- 1996 Leo Baeck Medal
