= Statue of Lew Wallace =

1910 statue by Andrew O'Connor

Lew Wallace
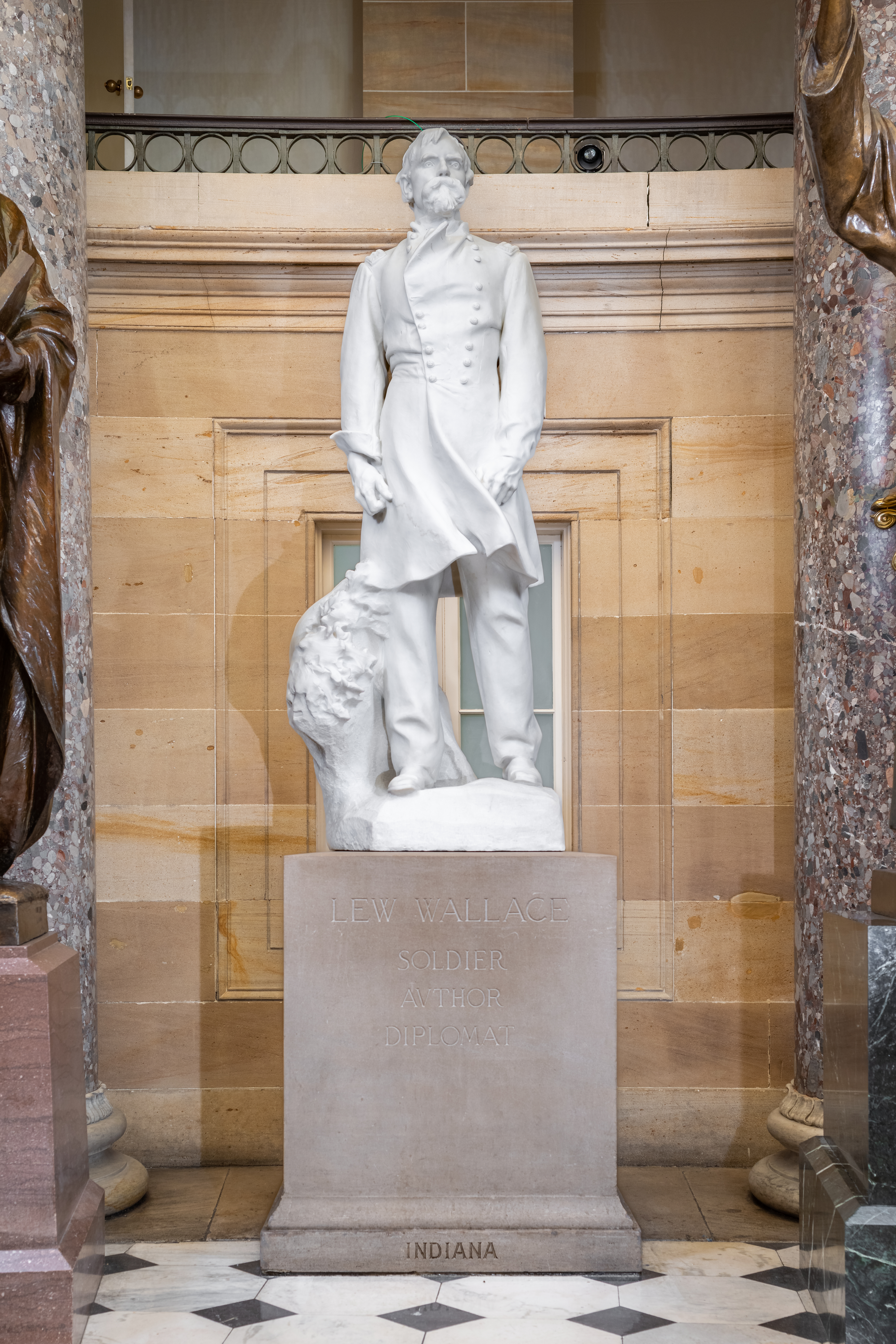
- The marble version at the National Statuary Hall in 2023
- Artist: Andrew O'Connor
- Subject: Lew Wallace

Lew Wallace is a statue of the American Union general, politician, and author Lew Wallace by American-Irish sculptor Andrew O'Connor that has been produced in both marble and bronze versions.

The marble version, a gift from the State of Indiana, was unveiled in the National Statuary Hall Collection in the Capitol in Washington, D.C., on January 11, 1910, in a commission that O'Connor received through the intervention of architect Cass Gilbert, with whom O’Connor had previously worked. The same year a bronze version of the work was dedicated in Wallace's home town of Crawfordsville, Indiana, at what was to become the General Lew Wallace Study and Museum.

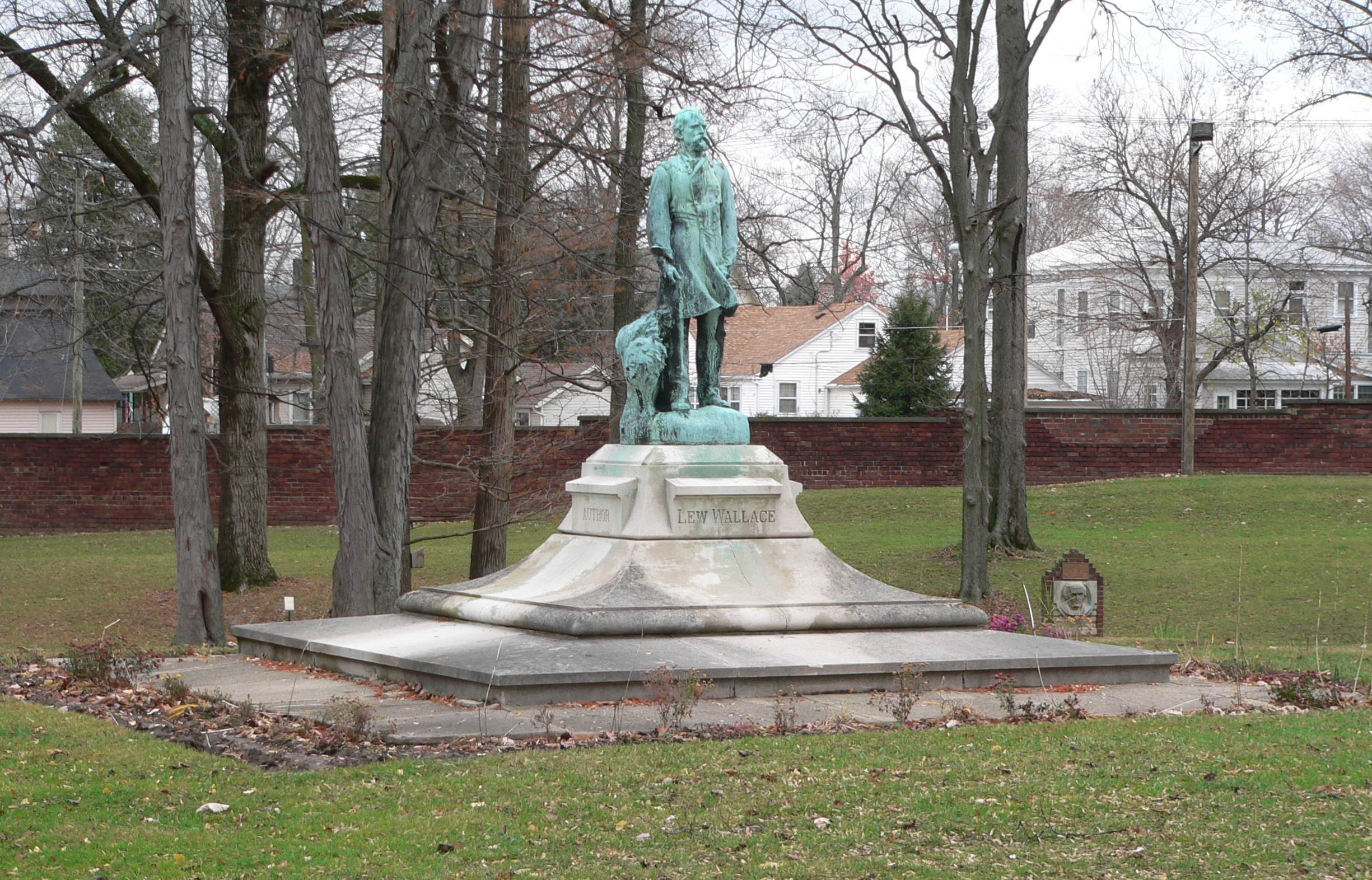
The bronze version in Crawfordsville, Indiana
