= Andrew O'Connor (sculptor) =

American sculptor

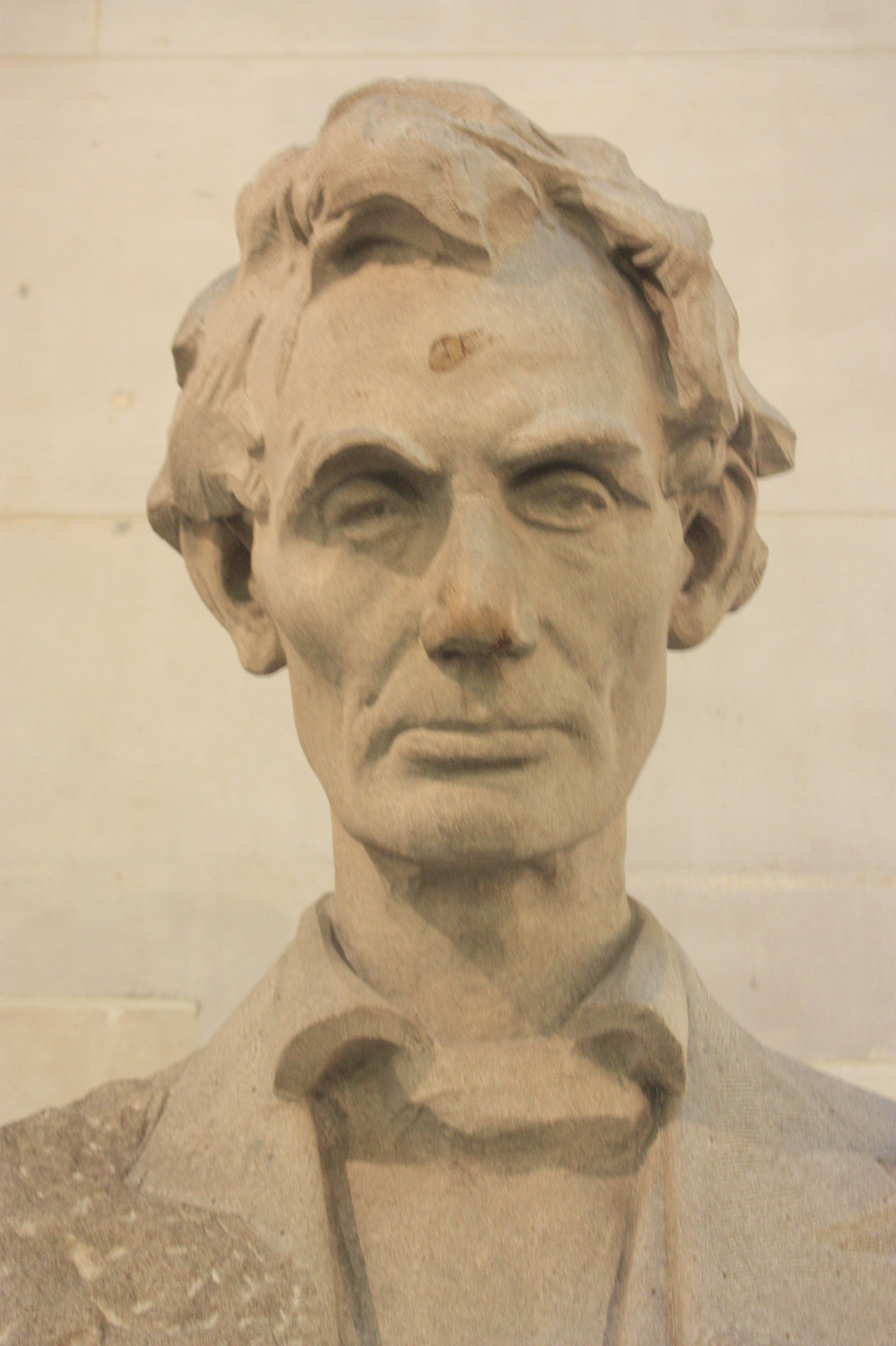
Bust of Abraham Lincoln (1930), Royal Exchange, London

Andrew O'Connor (June 7, 1874 – June 9, 1941) was an American-Irish sculptor whose work is represented in museums in America, Ireland, Britain, and France.

== Life ==
O'Connor was born in Worcester, Massachusetts, and died in Dublin, Ireland. His father, Andrew O'Connor (1846–1924), of Lanarkshire, Scotland, was a stonecutter who became a professional sculptor. As a teenager, he apprenticed to his father, helping him to design monuments for cemeteries.

For a time he was in the London studio of the painter, John Singer Sargent, and later worked for the architects, McKim, Mead and White in America and with the sculptor Daniel Chester French. Settling in Paris in the early years of the 20th century, he exhibited annually at the Paris Salon. In 1906 he was the first foreign sculptor to win the Second Class medal for his statue of General Henry Ware Lawton, now in Garfield Park in Indianapolis. In 1928 he achieved a similar distinction by being awarded the Gold Medal for his Tristan and Iseult, a marble group now in the Brooklyn Museum. His work was also part of the sculpture event in the art competition at the 1928 Summer Olympics.

A number of his plaster casts are in the Hugh Lane Municipal Gallery, Dublin and there are works in Tate Britain, the Walters Art Museum, Baltimore, the Corcoran Gallery of Art, the Metropolitan Museum of Art and the Musée d'Art Moderne, Paris.

O'Connor was involved in a minor controversy in 1909 when he was commissioned to design a statue for Commodore John Barry, of the American Revolutionary-era navy. O'Connor's first design was heatedly attacked by Irish-American groups. He submitted a second version, but it too was ultimately rejected, and the sculptor John J. Boyle received the commission.

== Selected works ==
- Vanderbilt Memorial Doors, St Bartholomew's Church, Manhattan, New York City, 1901–03
- Recueillement (also known as Bronze Lady), Sleepy Hollow Cemetery, Sleepy Hollow, New York, 1903. The model for the statue was O'Connor's future wife (and favorite model), Jessie Phoebe Brown.
- General Henry Ware Lawton, Garfield Park, Indianapolis, Indiana, 1906
- Statue of Lew Wallace, National Statuary Hall Collection, U.S. Capitol, Washington, D.C., 1910
- Governor John Albert Johnson, Nicollet County Courthouse Grounds, St. Peter, Minnesota 1912
- Governor John Albert Johnson, Minnesota State Capitol, St. Paul, 1912
- 1898 Soldier, Spanish–American War Memorial, Wheaton Square, Worcester, Massachusetts, 1917. The model for O'Connor's statue was his student, Vincent Schofield Wickham.
- Abraham Lincoln, Illinois State Capitol, Springfield, 1918
- The Victims, Merrion Square, Dublin, Ireland, c. 1923, (dedicated 1947). Intended for a World War I Memorial in Washington, D.C. (abandoned), it depicts a kneeling wife and a standing mother mourning a dead soldier.
  - A copy of Kneeling Wife (c. 1923) is at the Tate Britain.
- Lafayette Monument, Mount Vernon Place, Baltimore, Maryland, 1924
- Christ the King, Dún Laoghaire, Ireland, 1926
- Tristan and Iseult, Brooklyn Museum, Brooklyn, New York City, 1928
- Bust of Abraham Lincoln, Royal Exchange, London, United Kingdom, 1930
- Seated Abraham Lincoln, Fort Lincoln Cemetery, Brentwood, Maryland, 1931 (dedicated 1947). The statue was commissioned for the Rhode Island Statehouse, but the project was abandoned during the Depression.
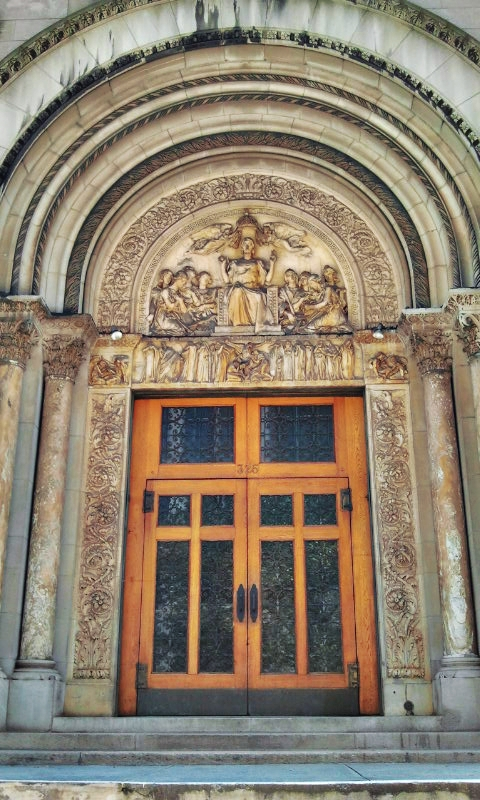
Vanderbilt Doors (1903), St. Bartholomew's Church, New York City

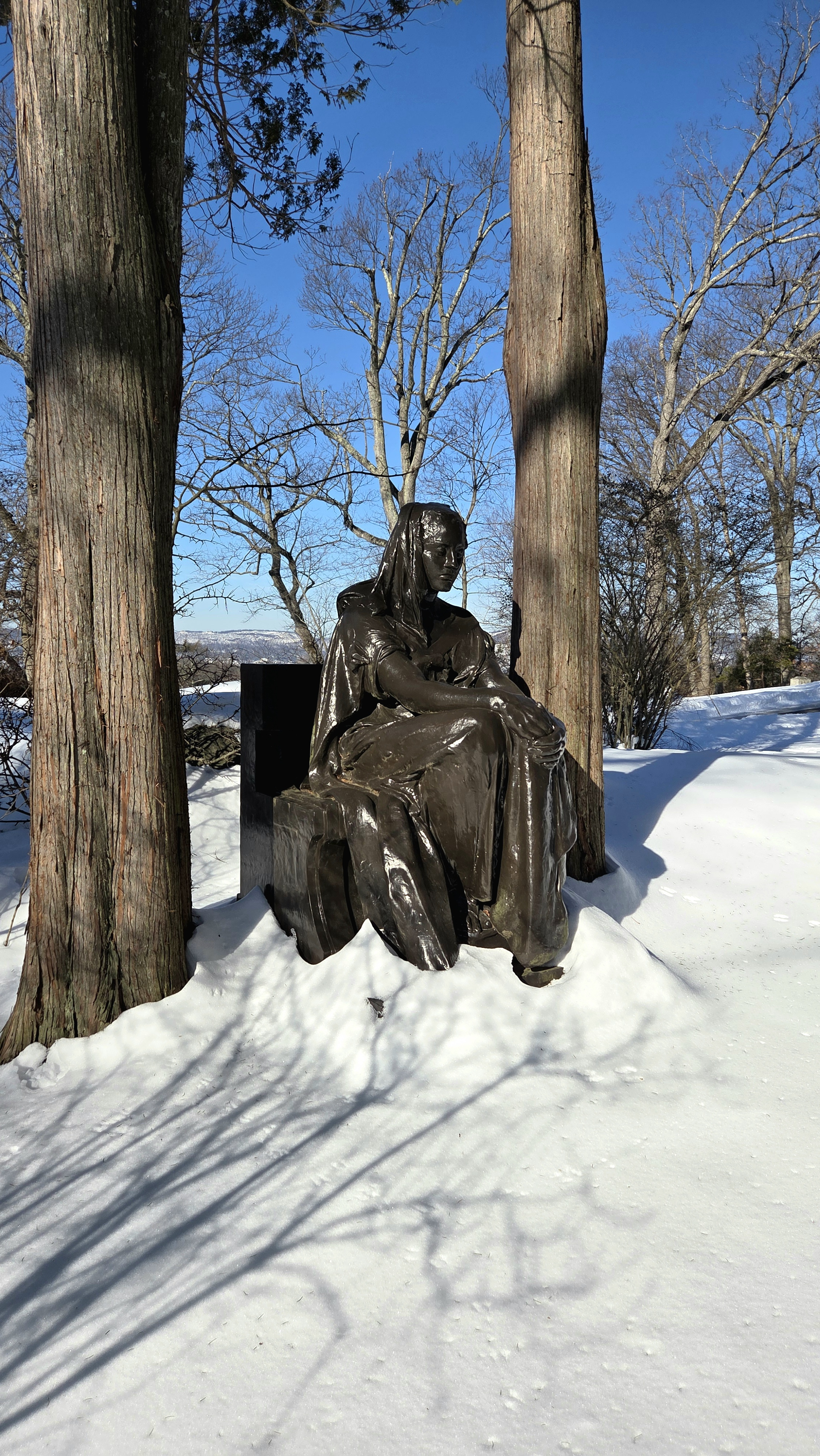
Recueillement (Bronze Lady) (1903), Sleepy Hollow Cemetery, Sleepy Hollow, New York

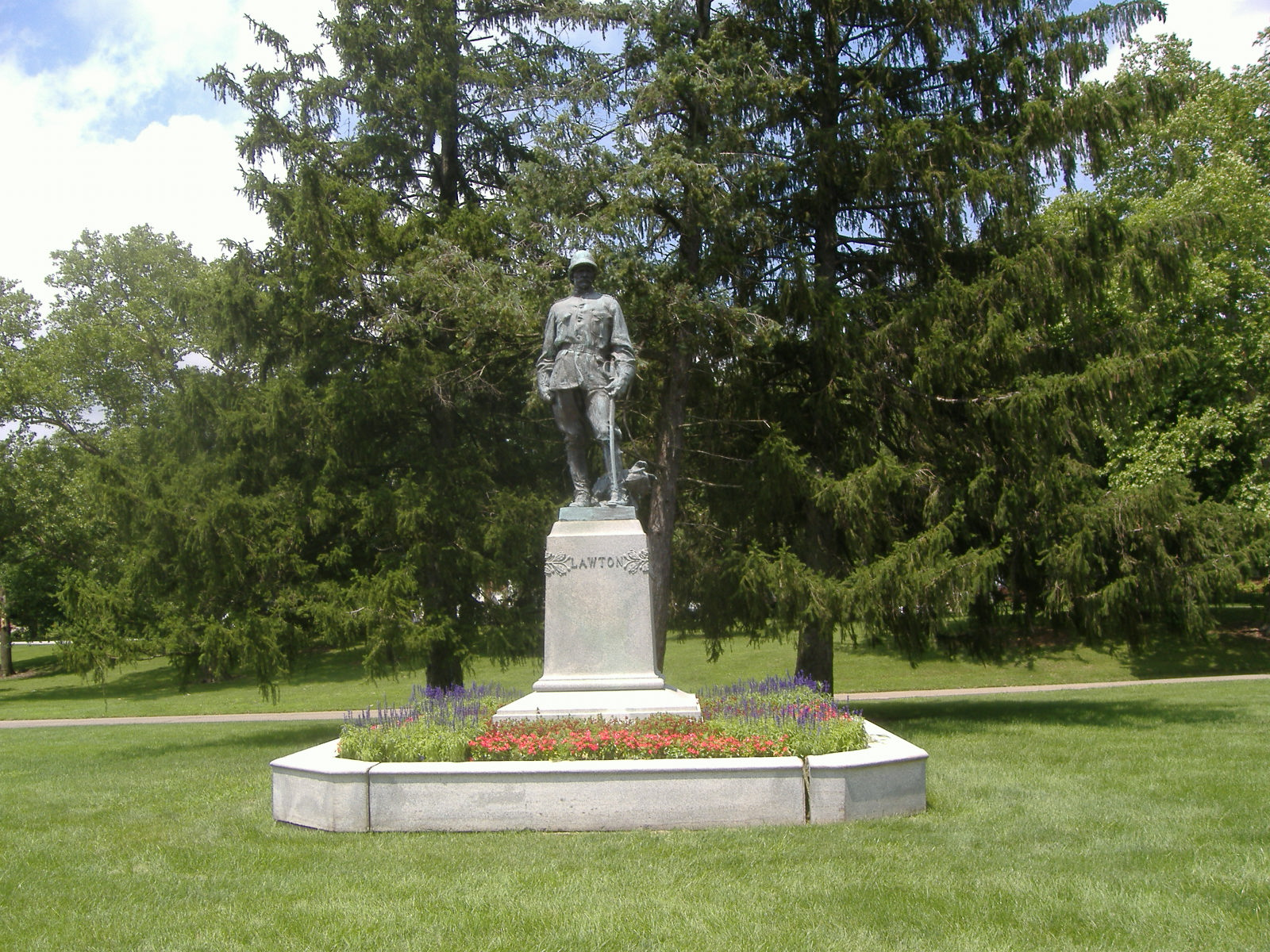
Gen. Henry Ware Lawton (1906), Indianapolis, Indiana

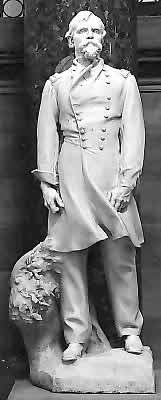
Gen. Lew Wallace (1910), U.S. Capitol, Washington, D.C.

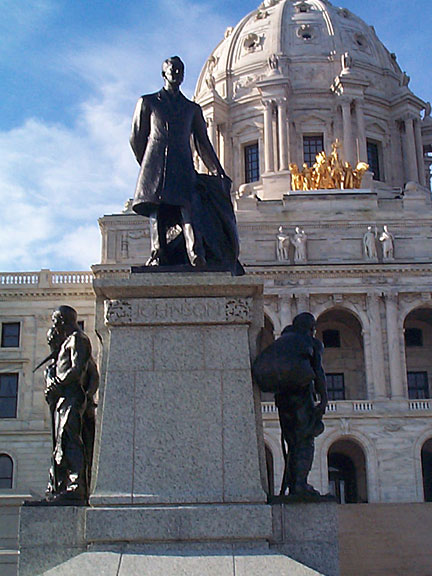
Gov. John Albert Johnson (1912), St. Paul, Minnesota

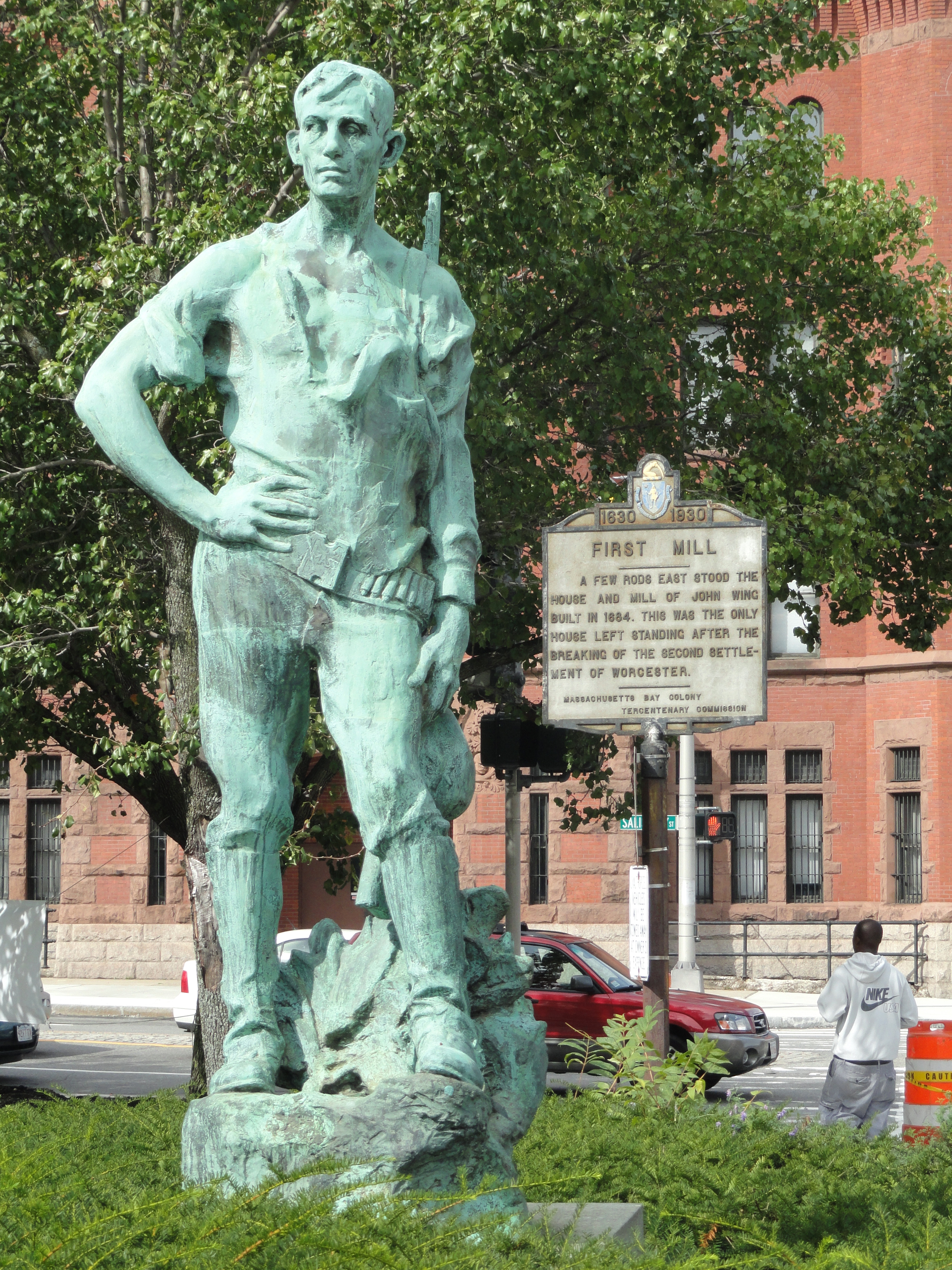
1898 Soldier (1917), Worcester, Massachusetts

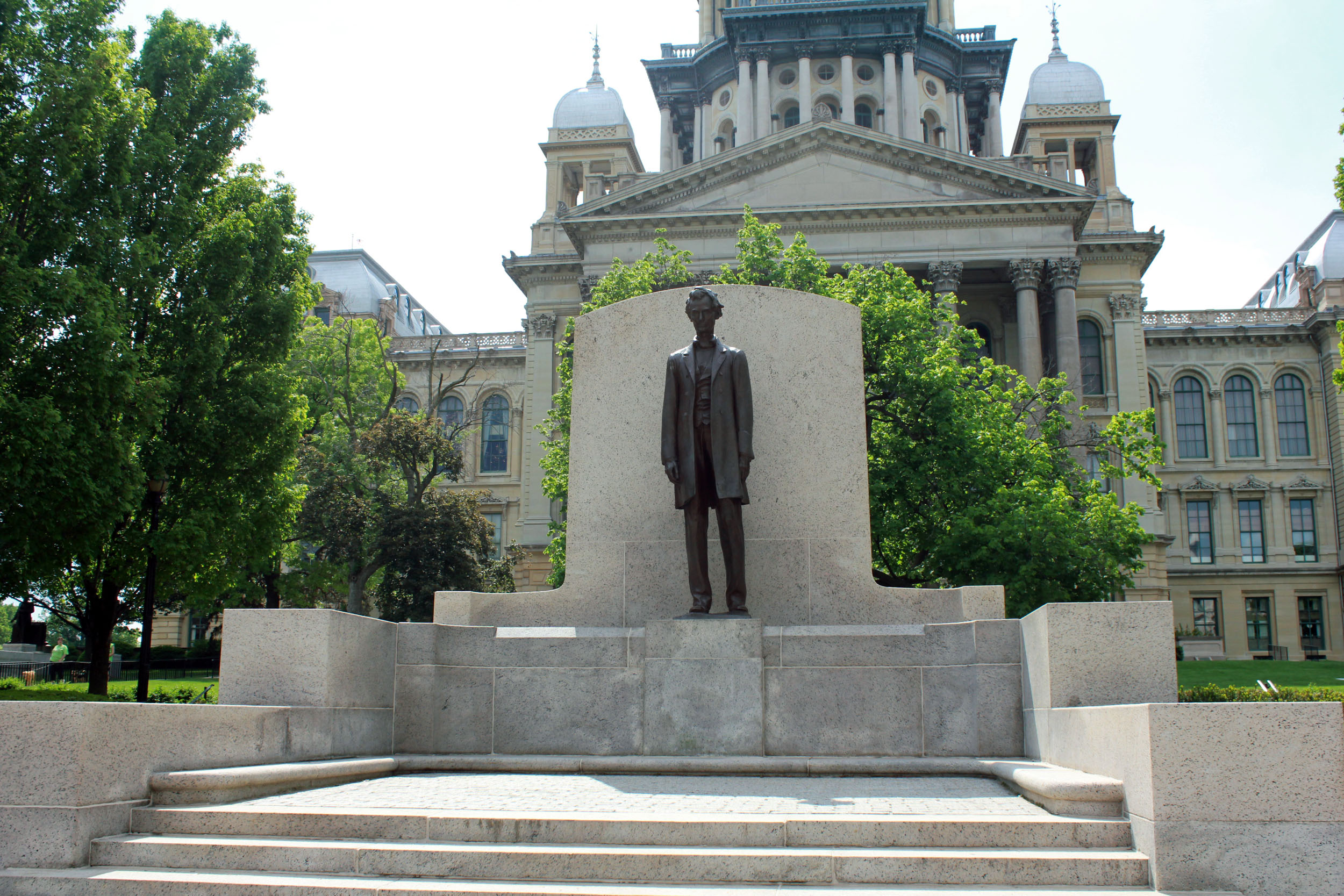
Abraham Lincoln (1918), Springfield, Illinois

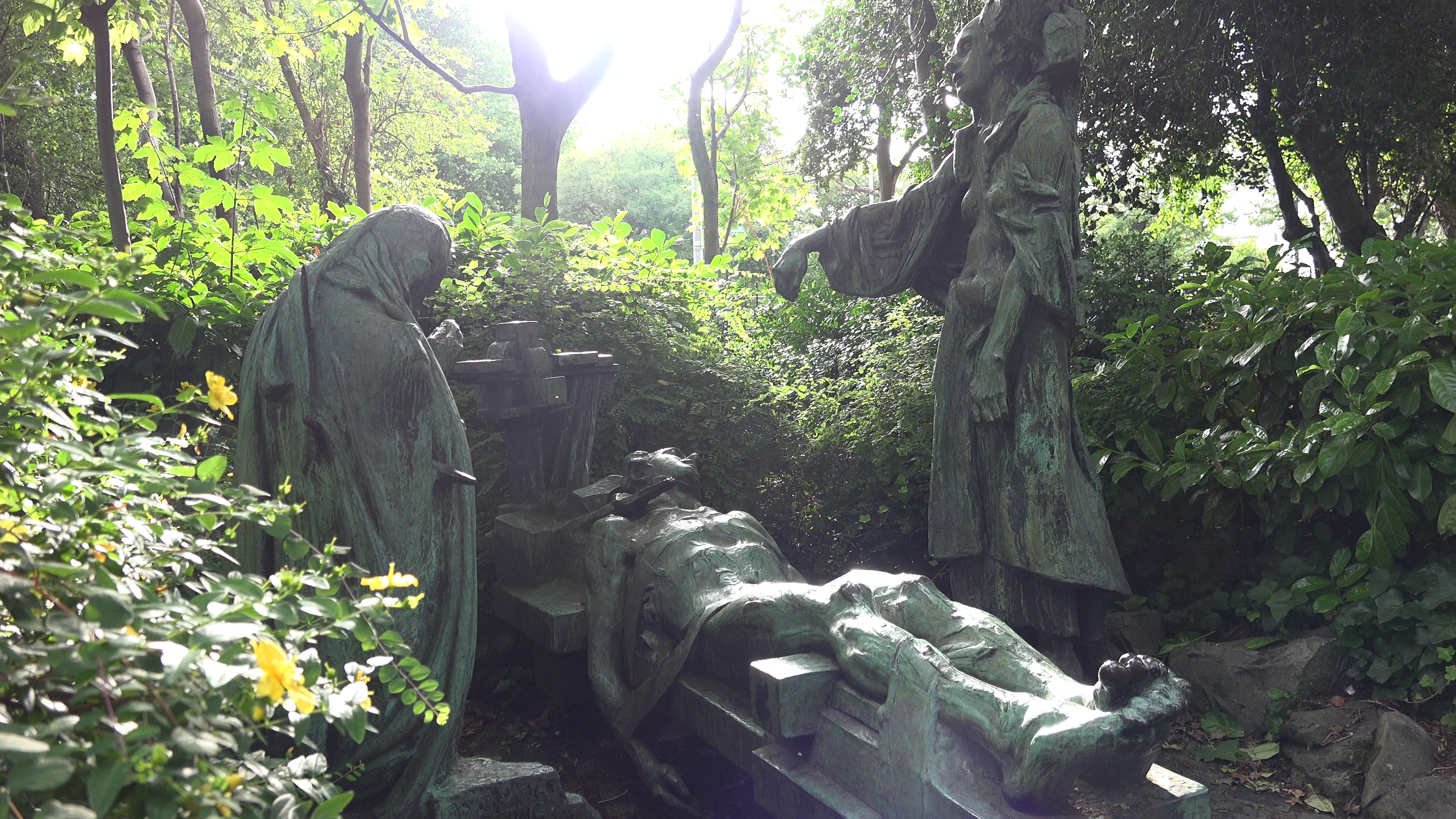
The Victims (c. 1923), Dublin, Ireland

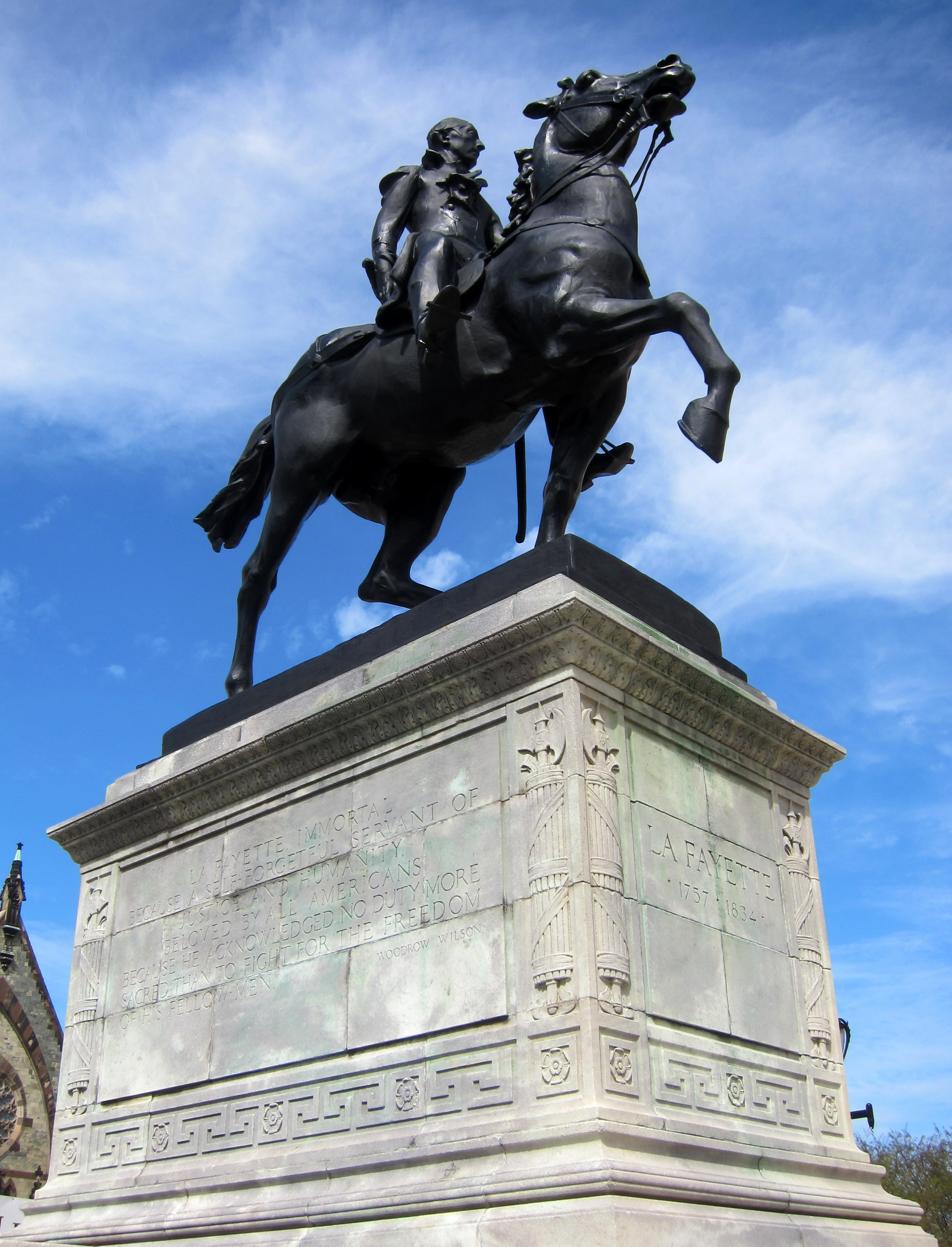
Equestrian statue of the Marquis de LaFayette (1924), Baltimore, Maryland

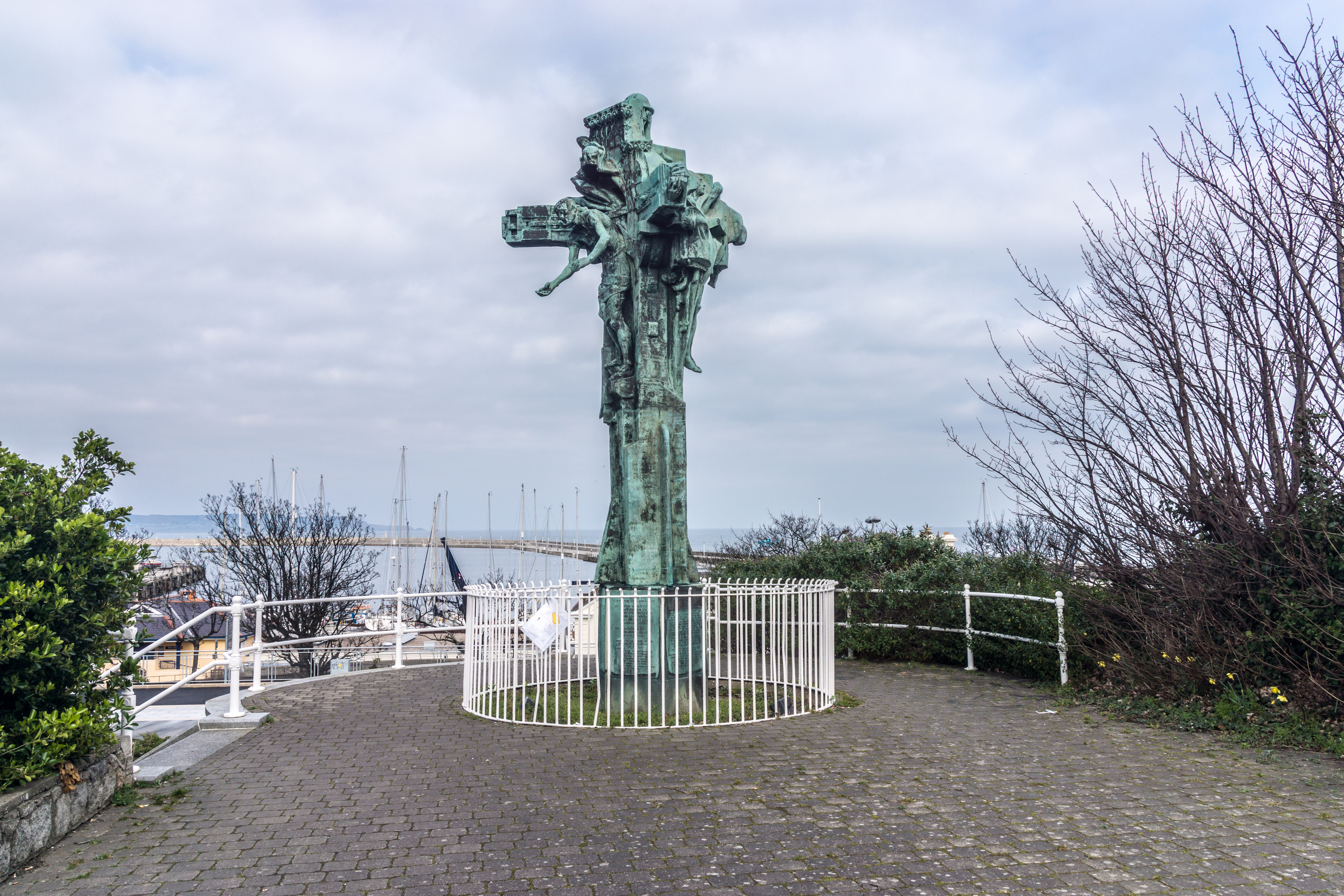
Christ the King (1926), Dún Laoghaire, Ireland

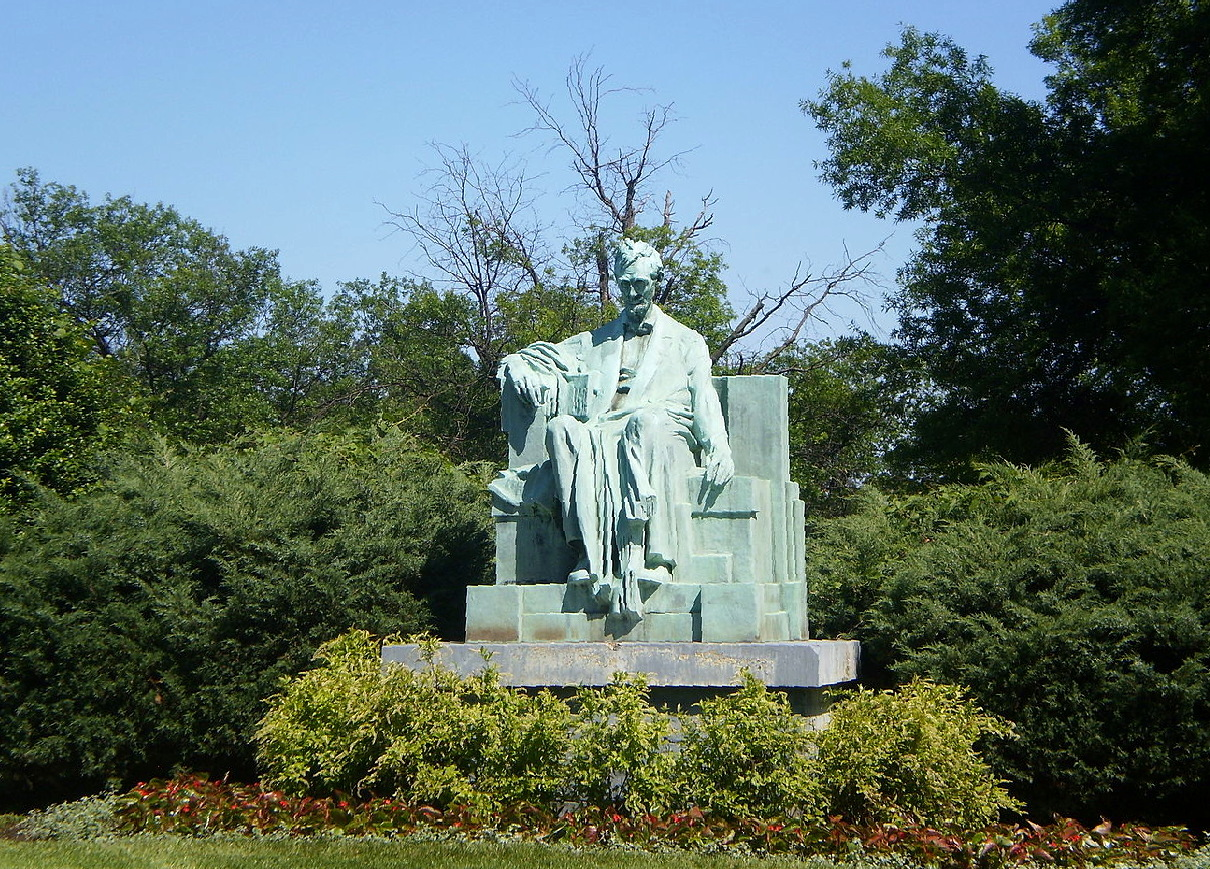
Seated Abraham Lincoln (1931), Brentwood, Maryland
