= Michael O'Keeffe (chemist) =

British-American chemist

- Born: April 3, 1934 (age 92); Bury St Edmunds, Suffolk, UK
- Education: University of Bristol
- Scientific career
- Institutions: Arizona State University
- Doctoral advisor: Frank S. Stone
- Other academic advisors: Evert W. Gorter; Walter J. Moore

Michael O’Keeffe (born April 3, 1934) is a British-American chemist. He is currently Regents’ Professor Emeritus in the School of Molecular Sciences at Arizona State University. As a scientist, he is particularly known for his contributions to the field of reticular chemistry. In 2019, he received the Gregori Aminoff Prize in Crystallography from the Royal Swedish Academy of Sciences.

== Early life and education ==
Michael O’Keeffe was born in Bury St Edmunds, Suffolk, England, on the 3rd April, 1934. He was one of four children born to Dr. E. Joseph O’Keeffe, an immigrant from Ireland, and his mother Marjorie G. O’Keeffe (née Marten). From 1942 to 1951 he attended Prior Park College (Bath) and then from 1951 to 1957 the University of Bristol: B.Sc. in chemistry (1954), Ph.D. (1958, mentor Frank S. Stone). He spent 1958-1959 at Philips Natuurkundig Laboratorium (group of Evert W. Gorter) then did postdoctoral research at Indiana University (mentor Walter J. Moore). 1960-62. He subsequently became a U. S. citizen.

== Career ==
In 1963, he joined Arizona State University where he is now Regents’ Professor of Chemistry. Early research work was devoted to the study of defects, conductivity and diffusion in solids, particularly solid electrolytes. His more recent research is devoted to the theory of periodic structures (nets (periodic graph (crystallography)), tilings (periodic tessellations, and weavings (a higher dimensional version of Braid theory)) relevant to development of a taxonomy of such structures and its application to materials design and description. In collaboration with Omar Yaghi, O’Keeffe developed reticular chemistry, a new branch of chemistry that links molecular fragments of well-defined shapes with strong bonds to build symmetrical open structures such as metal-organic frameworks (MOFs), zeolitic imidazolate frameworks (ZIFs), and covalent organic frameworks (COFs) Together with Olaf Delgado-Friedrichs, he has developed the Reticular Chemistry Structure Resource (RCSR) a compendium of structures relevant to design of materials on the molecular level. O'Keeffe has published three books, including one of the standard monographs on periodic structures, and more than 300 refereed papers. His work is highly cited (over 100,000 citations and h index over 100), and he was third in the Clarivate#Highly Cited Researchers list of Top 100 Chemists, 2000-2010

== Honors and awards ==
Among his honors are: the 2019 Gregori Aminoff Prize (Royal Swedish Academy); the Bernal Distinguished Lecturer, University of Limerick, 2017; the World Class Professorship, KAIST, Korea, 2013; Newcomb Cleveland Prize from the American Association for the Advancement of Science in 2007; Regents' Professor, Arizona State University 1994; and D. Sc. “for excellence in published research” University of Bristol, 1976.

== Bibliography ==
- O'Keeffe, Michael; Navrotsky, Alexandra (1981). Structure and bonding in crystals I. New York: Academic Press. doi:10.1016/b978-0-12-525101-3.x5001-3. ISBN 978-0-12-525101-3.
- O'Keeffe, Michael; Navrotsky, Alexandra (1982). Structure and bonding in crystals II. New York: Academic Press. ISBN 0-12-525101-7. OCLC 7576496.
- O'Keeffe, Michael; Hyde, Bruce G. (2020). Crystal structures : patterns and symmetry. Mineola, New York: Dover. ISBN 978-0-486-83654-6. OCLC 1125277894.

== See also ==
- John C. H. Spence
