= Metal organic cages =

Metal organic cages (MOCs) are "discrete molecular assemblies with nanoscale dimensions, formed through the self-assembly of metal ions or clusters and organic ligands via coordination" Metal organic polyhedra and metal organic cages have some similarities, but the main difference is indicated by "Such high-symmetry structures contain pseudospherical cavities, and so typically bind roughly spherical guests. Biomolecules and high-value synthetic compounds are rarely isotropic, highly-symmetrical species. To bind, sense, separate, and transform such substrates, new, lower-symmetry, metal-organic cages are needed" Indicating that the MOCs have distinct pore size that is advantageous to certain types of applications.

== History ==
Originating from reticular chemistry and supramolecular chemistry, the 1990s popularized the synthesis of 3D molecular complexes. The term cage was first defined in the chemical sense as "... is normally associated with a closed pattern in the middle of which something is located. Thus we assume that in a birdcage there should be a bird. In chemistry the term "cage" is more widely used: it is first a polycyclic compound that contains atoms connected with one another in such a way that an enclosed volume is created. In this volume no atom or atomic group needs to be situated, and often there is no place for even a hydrogen atom." Here the author refers to what is now described as porosity, having inherent volume within the structure of the cage. The genesis MOCs began with fundamental concepts of inorganic chemistry when attempting to bind metal and nonmetal compounds together. Late 1990s work with cage like complexes included work from the Makoto Fujita where he synthesized unique coordination complexes. One complex was two identical cages interlocked. The other complex was a novel hexahedron complex that was nanometers in size. Complexes like these inspired work later. The Early 2000s saw the Stang group review the topic of these cages and describe achieving their different shapes through self assembly. The review described highly symmetric and nano-porous materials that took advantage of euclidean as well as Archimedean geometry. These were discussed in a host-guest application since there was limited work on these cages in a materials chemistry application.

=== Zirconium and iron MOCs ===
In the early 2000s Omar Yaghi created MOCs that used the idea of these trinuclear clusters to synthesize the first tetrahedral MOCs. Although the Yaghi group used iron (III) as the vertices for their cages they still created a similar trinuclear cluster as the zirconium. These synthesized iron (III) cages used a variety of "bdc" ligands to bind iron (III). The cages demonstrated porosity, relevant thermal stability, and crystallinity. These factors developed the field and led to enhanced application of these cages. Interestingly, there have not been any iron (III) cages reported in the literature since the origin of this paper. A recent review states, "Although these cages were promising in this regard, their syntheses are rather challenging as phase purity is a significant issue. This may also be a reason that no additional porous MOPs of this type have been reported."

== Synthesis of modern-day MOCs ==
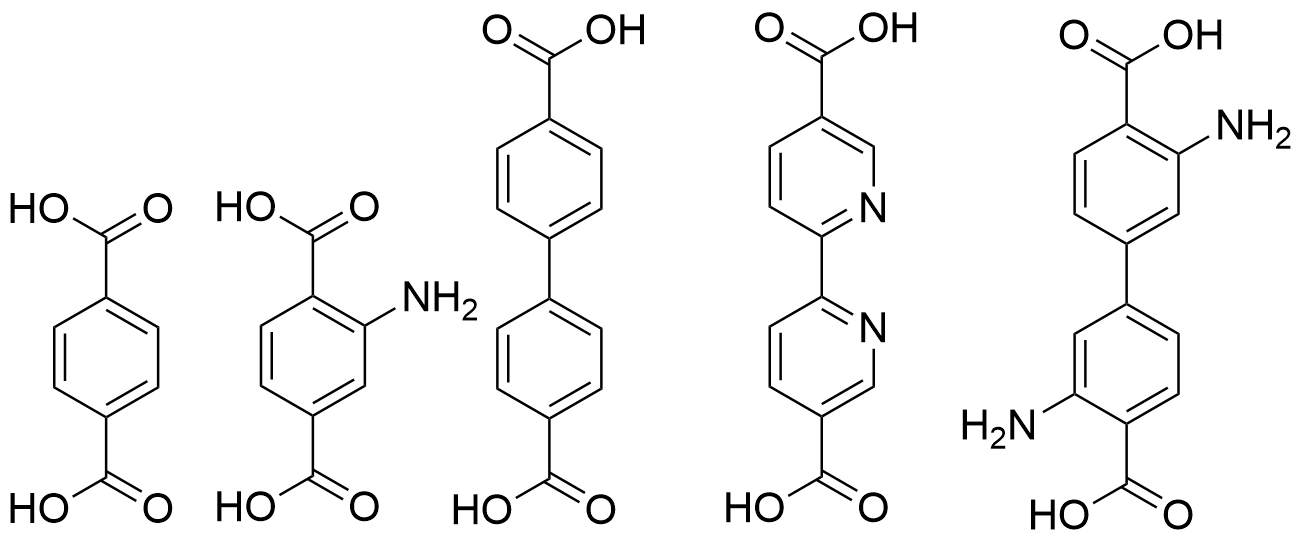
Common ligands that are used to synthesize MOCs

Today MOCs are typically prepared using zirconium cyclopentadiene salts or trinuclear zirconium clusters.^{,}^{,} The precise mechanism at which the cages form is currently not fully understood. Although from a theoretical understanding of organic and inorganic chemistry, some general ideas can be derived. When synthesizing MOCs with the zirconocene dichloride the trinuclear cluster forms in situ while binding to the linkers of the cages. Typically, there are two phases of tetrahedral cages. There is a "lantern" phase and a tetrahedral phase. recent studies show that the tetrahedron is thermodynamically favorable, but both phases can be produced. Currently, there is no reported way to separate these phases. Although some hypotheses suggest that tuning the steric bulk of the linkers will increase the thermodynamic favorability of the MOCs to form the tetrahedron phase.^{,} During synthesis of the cages when using the zirconium clusters there is likely a ligand exchange with some substituents that are already present on the cluster. Although the mechanism is still being studied. Other transition metals are also often used to make these MOCs or MOPs, and various differently shaped cages as well. Some common metals that are used are Pd, Fe(II), Zr, and Cu. Common shapes that are synthesized are cuboctahedra, octahedra, and tetrahedra.

== Characterization ==
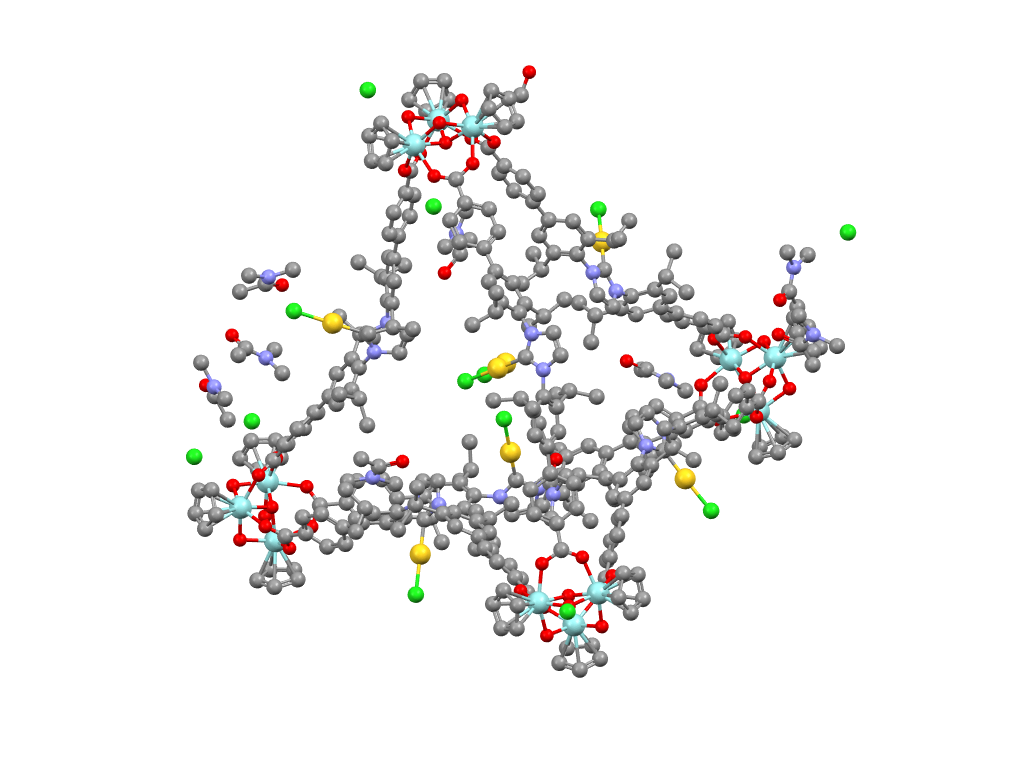
X-ray Crystal structure of Gold functionalized NHC cage from Han Group

MOCs are characterized by various common chemical and physical characterization techniques such as NMR, mass spectrometry, single-crystal X-ray crystallography, and thermogravimetric analysis. Many of these cages can be solubilized in common organic solvents such as DMF, and DEF. Some of their solubility has been attributed to the counter anion of the cage. Since the cages can be solubilized NMR has been the leading quick characterization technique for most cage complexes. Mass spectrometry has been used to determine the shape of the cage since each cage shape has a unique molecule weight. The distribution of the cages at the theoretical molecular weight is typical since their distribution of isotopes is present in the cages. Single crystal X-ray crystallography is common to determine exact structural information about the cages. Even the original works of these cages use X-ray crystallography to determine the structure of the cages. This method is used to show that the cages are porous in the solid state and for precise molecular imaging of the cage compounds. This technique is a definitive way to show that the cage compounds are formed.

== Gas capture ==
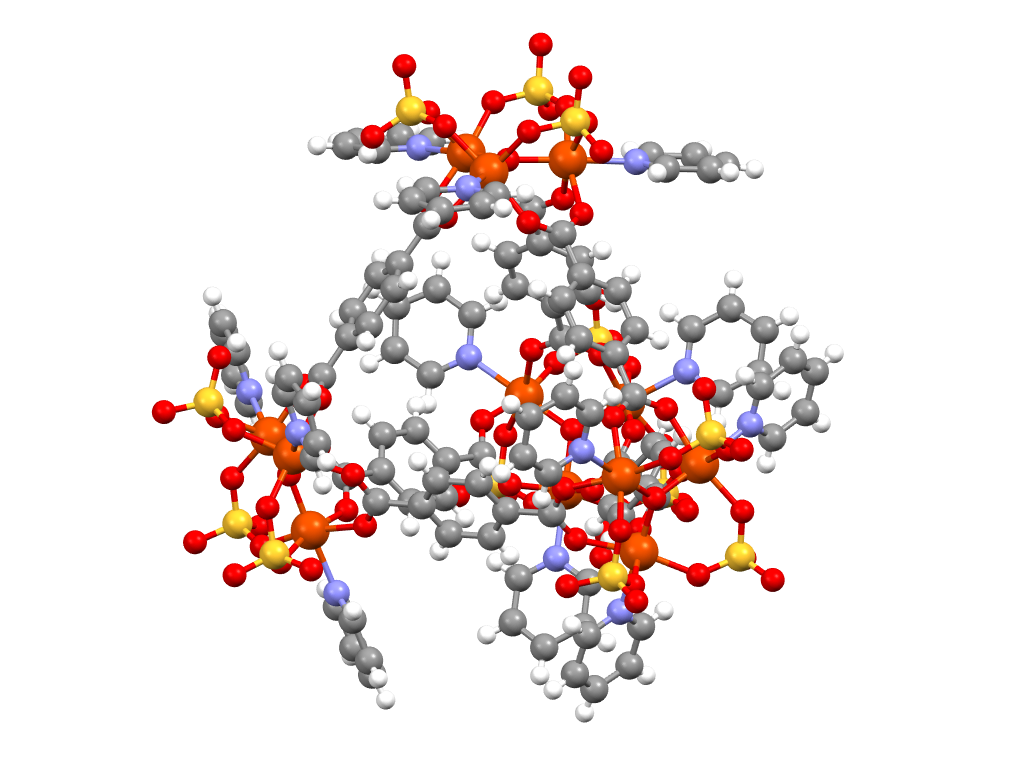
X-ray Crystal structure of IR-50 MOP created by Yaghi group

Taking advantage of the porosity of the discrete structure of cages allows for the absorption and possibly sequestration of gases into the cage structure. Early in the creation of the cages, there was evidence for gas sorption. This led to further development to enhance the capability of these cages to sorb more gaseous compounds. Researchers have developed methods that include casting these cages into a polymer membrane to increase the absorption of gaseous compounds. MOCs have also been used to separate gasses such as ethylene/acetylene and ethylene and carbon dioxide. This article reported using a tetrazole-functionalized tetrahedral MOC and leveraged the hydrogen bonding of the gases and the tetrazole to increase the sorption of ethylene preferentially. Gas capture with MOCs is expanding, and competitive but is still outperformed by metal-organic frameworks.

== Catalysis ==
Functionalization of the cage structure is typically done by synthesizing ideal ligand platforms for binding single metals. The discrete structure and highly tunable nature of the cages allow for various functionalizations. One group that took advantage of this was using a Pd cage-type catalyst in aqueous media. Typically the cross-coupling reaction that is done in this reaction is only done in organic solvents. Another target of this paper was to increase the re-usability of the catalyst. These authors showed that the MOCs can be a suitable platform for heterogeneous catalysts and reusable catalysts. A drawback of homogenous catalysts is that eventually catalyst, even after one use could not be reused. Many MOCs and MOP catalysts aim to solve this issue. Other, more green chemical uses of the cages involve the reduction of carbon dioxide with bipyridine ligand that is bound to rhenium. These authors highlight a versatile ligand used in many types of chemistry, bipyridine (bipy). This shows the applicability of the cages, and how versatile they can be if they are functionalized properly. The reduction of carbon dioxide has a high turnover frequency, as well as high stability. Molecule forms of this compound show much less promising results. The cage structure provides stability, and molecule flexibility which provides evidence that the cage does not degrade for a short period and the reduction occurs more frequently most likely because of the increased molecule motion.

== Biological application ==
Some MOCs have fluorescent properties, and some scaffolding for the cages is made from zirconium which is a non-toxic metal so there are numerous biological imaging applications for these cages. Cage porosity can even be leveraged in biological systems. One group used cage porosity to make a channel through a lipid membrane to pass ions through the channel. The group leveraged using large BINOL ligands which feature an inherently chiral selective group to allow for the selective transport of amino acids. MOCs have also shown to have high membrane permeability which could be useful for the application for drug delivery.^{,} MOCs can be used to detect the presence of antibiotics via fluorescence quenching. Many cages have inherent fluorescence due to their conjugated pi electron systems which can be leveraged in enhancement or quenching. Many compounds can quench the fluorescence of the cages via the binding of other physical-chemical interactions. The detection of the antibiotics was done with the hosting of the antibiotics in the cages which reduces the fluorescence character. The MOC fluorescent character is intense enough to view via cell imaging. MOCs have a diverse range of rational ligand designs to make highly versatile and useful MOCs.

== Environmental application ==
Detection of environmental contaminants can also be an application of MOCs. The solution state porosity and host guest properties of the MOCs allow for the hosting of ions. These ions can ion-pair to the ligands and quench fluorescence like the biological application. Specifically, iron (III) and Iodide. The challenge with the quenching is that if the lambda max does not overlap with that of the MOC there will be no change in fluorescence, and therefore no ability to detect ions. Another use of the polymer MOC matrices is desalination. The "polymoc" framework allows for the selective passthrough of ions. The matrices are made into a thin film that allows for the desalination of water and does not inhibit the flux of water passing through the thin film membrane. MOC development will continue to diversify and push forward the materials field.
