= Reticular Chemistry Structure Resource =

Crystallography database

The Reticular Chemistry Structure Resource (RCSR) is an online database and topological classification system for periodic nets - abstract graphs used to represent the connectivity of atoms, ions, or molecular clusters within crystalline and reticular materials. The RCSR has become the standardized reference system for the classification and characterization of framework materials across the field of reticular chemistry. Each net in the database is defined by its underlying graph topology, including coordination numbers, vertex figures, transitivity, symmetry, and other invariants relevant to the mathematical description of extended structures. By providing a standardized nomenclature and consistent topological descriptors, the RCSR enables comparison among framework materials, identification of new network types, and rational design of architectures in reticular chemistry.

== History ==
The RCSR was introduced in 2008 by Michael O’Keeffe, Maxim Peskov, Stuart Ramsden, and Omar M. Yaghi in a published article. The database was originally hosted by the Supercomputer Facility at the Australian National University in Canberra. At the time of publication, it contained approximately 1,600 topological nets. A 2022 analysis using the CrystalNets.jl topology-identification toolkit reported that the RCSR contained 3,132 structures with two- or three-periodicity, excluding weaving nets and zero- or one-periodic entries. The database is currently maintained by Olaf Delgado-Friedrichs and Michael O’Keeffe.

== Method and purpose ==
RCSR classifies nets based on their graph-theoretic properties, abstracted from specific chemical compositions. In this representation, nodes correspond to atoms, ions, or molecular building units, while edges represent bonds or linkers. The resulting topological net provides a theoretical description of a material’s three-dimensional connectivity without chemical details.

Each net is assigned a unique three-letter symbol in bold lowercase (e.g., dia, bor) from the RCSR, which is widely used along other topology repositories in the field. These three-lettered symbols include connectivity information for nodes and edges, along with descriptors such as dual nets, face symbols, and tilings.

RCSR provides collections of crystal nets representing the topological frameworks of metal–organic frameworks (MOFs), covalent organic frameworks (COFs), zeolites, coordination polymers, inorganic frameworks, and other classes of reticular solids. Each topology is assigned a unique three-letter symbol in bold lowercase, following the conventions introduced in the 2008 publication.

== Classification system ==
In 2020 the RCSR was reorganized to classify nets according to dimensionality—0-, 1-, 2-, or 3-periodic—and to separate each class into default and weaving subsets. The categories are defined as follows:

=== 0-periodic ===
- Default: Convex polyhedra and selected cage structures with 2-coordinated vertices
- Weaving: Knots, polycatenanes, and entangled polyhedral forms

=== 1-periodic ===
- Default: Cylinder tilings
- Weaving: Interlocked chain-like components not linked by edges

=== 2-periodic ===
- Default: Plane tilings
- Weaving: Threaded or woven layers, polycatenanes, and interlocked 2D nets

=== 3-periodic ===
- Default: Three-dimensional framework nets (majority of entries)
- Weaving: Multi-component 3D structures including interpenetrating, woven, or threaded nets

== Applications ==
The RCSR has been used extensively to classify and analyze the topologies of:

- MOFs
- COFs
- zeolites
- coordination polymers
- Inorganic and hybrid framework materials
- Hypothetical framework materials.

RCSR has been applied to identify and classify structures such as RE-csq-MOF-1, HIAM-4040 and HIAM-4040-OH, the MOCOF-1 series, and hypothetical structures generated through reverse topological approaches. RCSR topologies are also used in high-throughput screening studies for gas adsorption, CO₂ capture, and other properties, where nets such as tfz-d and dmp are selected for computational optimization.

== See also ==
- Reticular chemistry
- Metal–organic framework
- Covalent organic framework
- Zeolites
