= Walter G. Klemperer =

American chemist

Walter G. Klemperer is an American chemist.

Klemperer graduated from Harvard College in 1968 with a Bachelor of Arts degree. He completed a PhD at the Massachusetts Institute of Technology under F. Albert Cotton in 1973. Klemperer then taught at Columbia University until 1981, when he joined the University of Illinois Urbana-Champaign faculty.

Klemperer was awarded a Guggenheim Fellowship in 1980, and elected a fellow of the American Association for the Advancement of Science in 1991. He was the PhD advisor of Omar M. Yaghi who received the Nobel Prize in Chemistry in 2025.
