= Reticular materials =

Class of artificial materials

Reticular materials are artificial materials that have been engineered at the molecular level to achieve certain properties, in particular a high porosity and high surface area. Reticular materials can be grouped into three major classes, in the order of their discovery: metal-organic frameworks or MOFs, covalent organic frameworks or COFs, and hydrogen-bonded organic frameworks or HOFs, each with respective sub-classes. An example for a sub-class of MOFs are zeolitic Imidazolate Frameworks (ZIFs).

MOFs are the most explored sub-class of reticular materials (around 77% of the approximately 48,000 publications on reticular materials between the 1990s to 2023 were on MOFs). MOFs are a type (or subclass) of coordination polymers. Around 99,000 synthetic variants of MOF are known. The structures and functionality of reticular materials, for example the pore size, are adjustable (or “tailorable”) during the synthesis process. This makes them in principle adjustable to many different technical requirements. Depending on the choice of materials and synthesis methods, reticular materials, because of the strong bonds, can be designed to withstand extreme temperatures and harsh chemical environments over extended periods of time.

There are many potential applications for reticular materials, although only very few applications have reached a commercial level to date. The initial application of reticular materials was mostly for gas adsorption and storage, followed later by other fields such as catalysis, biomedicine, and membrane technologies. Examples for gas adsorption and storage technologies with reticular materials include carbon capture and storage, direct air capture, atmospheric water harvesting and hydrogen storage. These are all applications that several start-up or commercial companies are now pursuing. Other applications that are being researched, including for biomedicine and catalysis, are still in their infancy and emerging states. Research is ongoing around the world to take the most promising reticular materials into the full-scale commercialization process for real-world applications. Hindering factors include scalability, high costs of reticular materials, reproducibility and poor technology readiness level. The company BASF produces raw MOFs at commercial quantities.

== Definition and overview ==
Reticular materials are materials that are constructed based on the concept of reticular chemistry. The term reticular is derived from the Latin term reticulum meaning net-like. The first-discovered and largest class of reticular materials are metal–organic frameworks (MOFs) but there are other classes, too, as well as many sub-classes. The two main other classes of reticular materials are covalent organic framework (COFs) and hydrogen-bonded organic framework (HOFs).

Reticular chemistry involves the “connection of individual building units such as molecules and clusters using robust bonding to form extensive and coherent architectures with highly ordered arrangement in a designed manner”. In other words, reticular chemistry is “concerned with linking molecular building units by strong bonds to make crystalline large and extended structures”. The term reticular synthesis, or reticular chemistry was introduced in 2002–2003 by the research team at UC Berkeley led by Omar M. Yaghi.

This emerging field of reticular chemistry has at its core inorganic and organic chemistry but it also adds the new chemistry of using the strong metal-ion-based bonds and covalent bonds to link molecules into extended structures, features unattainable prior to reticular chemistry.

Prior to the discovery of MOFs, zeolites and activated carbons were the main porous materials used in industry for applications where a high surface area was required. However, the surface area of MOFs is much higher than that of zeolites and activated carbons, i.e. in the range of 1000–10,000 m^{2}/g. This makes them an interesting material for industry.

In addition, the structure of the cavities and the size of the pore in MOFs can be tailored as a function of metal ions, organic ligands, and synthesis conditions, and hence are thus amenable to engineering for targeted applications.

== History ==
In the 1990s, the research activities of Omar M. Yaghi first at the Arizona State University and then at University of Michigan in the United States involved synthesizing ordered molecular structures. In 1999 he and co-authors published an article in Nature called “Design and synthesis of an exceptionally stable and highly porous metal-organic framework” where they described MOF-5, the first MOF to exhibit ultra-high porosity. This marked the beginning of a new research field. The new term metal–organic framework was coined by that research group.

The evolution of porous materials with diverse topologies has a rich history, traced back to the assembly of inorganic clusters into extended frameworks. This was followed by the synthesis of metal–organic frameworks (MOFs) in the 1990s, which involved linking organic molecules and metal ions. Subsequently, covalent organic frameworks (COFs) emerged after first being synthesized by Omar M. Yaghi and his group in 2005. COFs are a type of reticular material that links organic molecules together. This was later followed by hydrogen-bonded organic frameworks (HOFs) (since around 2011), representing the latest generation of reticular materials. A publication in 2011 by Banglin Chen (University of Texas at San Antonio) introduced the term HOF to the scientific community.

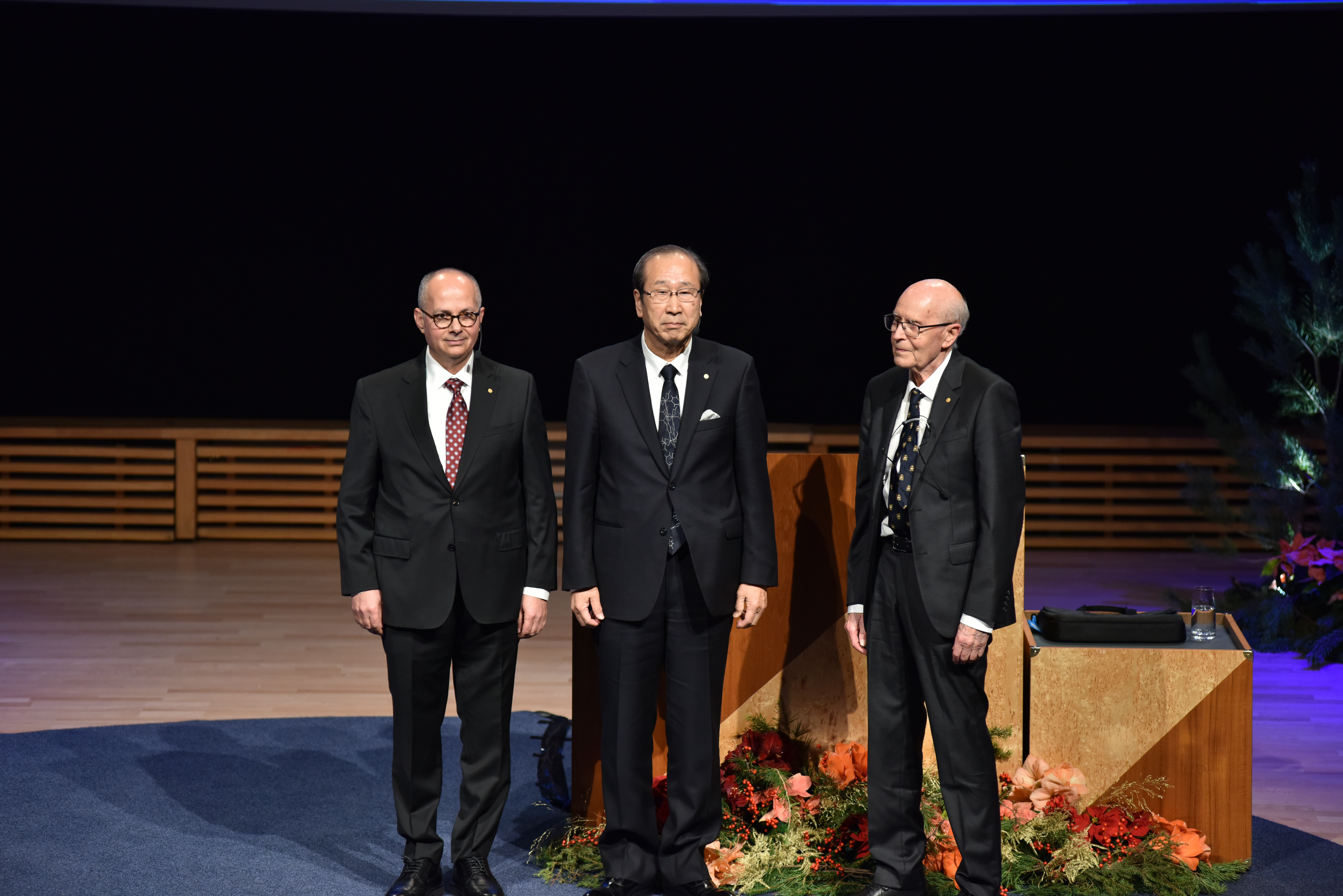
The three scientists Omar M. Yaghi, Susumu Kitagawa, and Richard Robson (from left to right) received the Nobel Prize for Chemistry in 2025 for the development of metal–organic frameworks which is a sub-category of reticular materials.

Almost 48 000 publications on reticular materials have been published in the three decades between the 1990s and 2023. Of these publications, most of them (around 77%) are on MOFs. They are the most explored sub-class of reticular materials.

Reticular materials are now (as of 2022) the “fastest-growing class of materials in chemistry and most-productive research hotspot among global communities of chemistry, engineering, and materials science.”

The scientists Omar M. Yaghi, Susumu Kitagawa and Richard Robson received the Nobel Prize in Chemistry in 2025 “for the development of metal–organic frameworks”. They have pioneered the field of reticular materials and chemistry.

== Terminology ==
There are many other terms that are related to reticular materials in the scientific literature, making it confusing for non-experts, as some terms are synonyms, some are “historical”, whereas others describe sub-classes or overarching terms. Also in some cases, different research groups use different terminology.

Some publications use the term MOF informally like a synonym of reticular materials, so that MOF would include COF and HOF as well. However, this is imprecise usage and a linguistic simplification.

Adding to the confusion is that compounds with metal ions bound by organic linkers have been “differently named: metal-organic frameworks, coordination polymers, metal-organic polymers, hybrid organic-inorganic materials and organic zeolite analogues”.

It was Yaghi's group at the university UC Berkeley that bestowed these materials with a distinctive naming convention, highlighting their contribution to the field. In 2006, the same group proposed the systematic name of zeolitic imidazolate frameworks, abbreviated as ZIF.

The IUPAC Recommendations from 2013 recommended a hierarchical terminology as follows “the most general term is coordination polymer. Coordination networks are a subset of coordination polymers and MOFs a further subset of coordination networks”. Therefore, MOFs are a type (or subclass) of coordination polymers.

The term porous polymer is also used as an overarching term for MOFs, COFs and HOFs.

With regards to sub-classes of reticular materials: Porous organic frameworks (POFs) are a sub-class of reticular materials and thought to be among the most significant categories of reticular materials. Reticular framework nanoparticles (RFNPs) are also a sub-class of reticular materials.

== Classes ==
=== Classification systems ===
Reticular materials can be grouped into three major classes: metal-organic frameworks (MOFs), covalent organic frameworks (COFs), and hydrogen-bonded organic frameworks (HOFs), each with respective sub-classes:

- Metal-organic frameworks (MOFs) (with a range of sub-classes for example Cyclodextrin-metal–organic framework (CD-MOF), Zeolitic Imidazolate Frameworks (ZIFs), Carboxylate-based metal–organic frameworks, Conductive metal−organic frameworks)
- Covalent organic frameworks (COFs)
- Hydrogen-bonded organic frameworks (HOFs)

=== Metal-organic framework (MOF) ===
The first reticular framework was synthesized in 1995, when it was discovered that metal ions could be bound to charged bonding agents, such as carboxylates, leading to the formation of crystalline 2D structures. A major breakthrough was achieved by linking inorganic clustered secondary building units (SBUs) with shape-defining connectors using strong molecular bonds.

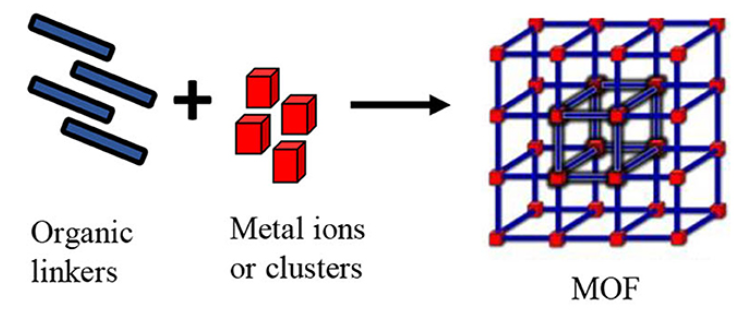
Schematic representation of the basic structure of metal-organic frameworks (MOFs)

Metal–organic frameworks (MOFs) are porous materials made from metal ions or clusters (also called joints) connected by organic ligands (linkers). These components combine to form structural units known as secondary building units (SBUs). A wide range of metal ions can be used, including transition metals, lanthanides, alkali metals and many others. Also the organic linkers can contain many different functional groups such as carboxylate, phosphonate, sulfonate, pyridyl, imidazolate.

During the initial stages of their development, the primary objective was centered on synthesizing new MOF structures. However, as the field progressed, there was a gradual transition toward studying the performance and applications of MOFs, which gained momentum with the emergence of stable MOFs like UiO, MIL, and ZIF.

To indicate a specific MOF, different naming methods are used: One way is to write MOF followed by a number, e.g. MOF-5. Another option is to include the location of the research group (like UiOs for University of Oslo, NU for Northwestern University, or HKUST for Hong Kong University of Science and Technology or LIC for Leiden Institute of Chemistry) or the name of the research team (like CPL, F-MOF-1, and MOP-1).

MOF crystal size can be controlled at the nanometre level to build MOF nanoparticles (abbreviated as MOF NPs).

The zeolite imidazolate frameworks (ZIFs) are a type of MOF and consist of many different materials. They all share a similar structure: transition metals such as zinc, iron, copper, or cobalt are connected by nitrogen atoms and linked together by imidazole rings.

A selection of notable MOFs, their key characteristics and applications. These MOFs are notable based on the timing of their discovery (e.g. being the first one) or because of full scale applications.

Name	Key characteristics	Possible applications (mostly laboratory; few large-scale)	Source
MOF-5	One of the earliest MOFs discovered (research published in 1999); Composed of zinc oxide (Zn_{4}O) clusters and terephthalic acid (BDC) ligands; Large surface area and high porosity; Thermally stable up to 300°C (does not collapse up to that temperature); Has played a significant role in the development of porous materials for energy and environmental applications	Gas storage, particularly hydrogen storage and carbon dioxide capture	
MOF-74	One-dimensional (1D) channel structure and honeycomb-like network with high porosity; Composed of metal ions, such as magnesium (Mg), cobalt (Co), or nickel (Ni), connected by 2,5-dihydroxyterephthalic acid (DHTA) linkers; High surface area and open metal sites	Gas adsorption applications, especially for hydrogen and carbon dioxide; gas storage	
MIL-101	Composed of chromium (Cr) nodes and terephthalic acid (BDC) linkers; Very large pore size and high surface area, making it one of the most porous MOFs synthesized	Gas storage (hydrogen and CO_{2}), separation, and catalysis, energy storage and environmental remediation (water pollution control)	
MOF-177	Composed of zinc (Zn) nodes and terephthalate linkers.; Very large pore volume and high surface area, making it one of the most porous MOFs synthesized.; Langmuir surface area of 4500 m²/g	Gas storage and separation, particularly for hydrogen and carbon dioxide capture	
UiO-66 (University of Oslo-66)	Composed of zirconium (Zr) nodes and terephthalic acid (BDC) ligands.; Very high chemical and thermal stability, making it a versatile material for various applications in harsh conditions.	Gas storage, separation, and catalysis	
CD-MOF (Cyclodextrin-based MOFs)	Composed of γ-cyclodextrin (γ-CD) and alkali metal cations; Non-toxic (even edible) and renewable; Can be efficiently synthesized on a large scale from natural carbohydrates.; Biocompatible and scalable	Drug delivery, CO_{2} capture, separation/purification, adsorption, sensors, food packaging, electrical conductors, memristors, photocatalysis, and polymerization.	
ZIF-8	Composed of zinc (Zn) nodes and imidazolate linkers.; Very high thermal and chemical stability, as well as structural flexibility.; High selectivity for CO_{2} over other gases	Gas storage and separation, particularly for CO_{2} capture; environmental remediation	
CALF-20	Invented at University of Calgary; Composed of zinc ions coordinated with triazolate and oxalate ligands, forming a three-dimensional porous structure.; Selectively adsorbs carbon dioxide (CO_{2}) over water.; Very stable under harsh conditions, including exposure to steam, wet acid gases, and prolonged contact with direct flue gas from natural gas combustion.; Robust and scalable; Surface area: 528 m^{2} per gram (Langmuir), 38% void volume, Selective CO_{2} physisorption: CO_{2} uptake 4.07 mmol g−1 at 1.2 bar and 293 K.	Industrial CO_{2} capture and storage, with potential applications in sectors such as cement production.	
Basolite A520	Surface area of 1300 m^{2} per gram (N_{2} BET)	Natural gas storage Large scale production by BASF	

=== Covalent organic framework (COF) ===
COFs are a type of porous materials characterized by their non-metallic composition. These materials are formed by arranging pre-designed organic-molecular building units into a well-ordered and repetitive structure through reversible covalent bonds. COFs exhibit a highly tunable structure, high crystallinity, chemical stability, and versatile functionalization.

What sets COFs apart is that their framework structure is solely determined by the choice of monomers. This unique characteristic allows COFs to be fully pre-designed. The resulting structural predictability is rarely achievable with traditional polymers and other molecular frameworks.

Compared to MOFs, COFs tend to have greater chemical and thermal stability. This stability arises from their structure, which consists of light elements linked by strong covalent bonds.

COFs are also suitable for water harvesting from air. Experiments used COF as exemplars for how to determine a priori the onset of water harvesting from a given porous framework structure.

A selection of notable COFs, their key characteristics and applications. These COFs are notable based on the timing of their discovery (e.g. being the first one) or because of full scale applications.

Name	Key characteristics	Possible applications (mostly laboratory; few large-scale)	Source
COF-108	The first three-dimensional COF; Highly ordered and crystalline structure.; Constructed from tetrahedral boron nodes and pyridine-based linkers; Extensive 3D porous network.; Significant surface area and open channels	Hydrogen storage	
COF-999	Its structure features olefin linkages; Post-synthetically modified with covalently attached amine initiators, leading to the formation of polyamines within its pores.; COF-999 allows for CO_{2} desorption at a relatively low regeneration temperature of 60 °C, which is advantageous for energy efficiency.	Carbon dioxide direct air capture (DAC) from ambient air Small-scale tests in open air at Berkeley, California.	

=== Hydrogen-bonded organic framework (HOF) ===
HOFs are constructed by assembling organic units, comprising both pure organic and metal-containing organic moieties, through robust hydrogen bonding interactions. The stability of these frameworks can be further reinforced through framework interpenetration and various weak intermolecular interactions, including π-π interactions, van der Waals interactions, etc.

HOFs are formed through hydrogen bonding, which is inherently weaker and more reversible compared to coordination or covalent bonds (i.e. the type of bonds prevalent in MOFs and COFs, respectively). Because of the hydrogen bonding connections, HOFs exhibit advantages compared to MOFs and COFs such as solution processability, facile synthesis and characterization. HOFs also have the ability to undergo easy healing and purification through simple recrystallization. They also show easy regeneration. On the other hand, it is harder to synthesize robust and porous HOFs than MOFs and COFs. This is because the H-bonding energy of the HOFs is weaker than the bonds in MOFs and COFs.

== Physical and chemical properties ==
The design of reticular materials can be tailored to specific needs through the choice of nodes (metal ions, organic molecules) and linkers (organic ligands, covalent bonds). This tunability allows precise control over physical, chemical, and mechanical properties.

To compare reticular materials, important properties include their surface area (unit: m^{2}/g) (measured as N_{2} BET area or as Langmuir surface area), density (unit: g/cm^{3}), specific pore volume (unit: cm^{3}/g), and pore size (unit: Å).

The exact values vary but what all reticular materials have in common are very high porosity and surface area. In an attempt to provide analogies that laypersons can understand: “one gram of these new MOFs has the surface area of several football fields”. MOFs can have surface areas of 1000–10,000 m^{2} per gram of material. HOFs fall in the lower third of that range: the highest BET surface area for HOFs was reported to be 3,400 m^{2} per gram.

To give some example figures: The two COFs termed COF-1 and COF-5 have pore sizes ranging from 7 to 27 angstroms; thermal stability to temperatures up to 500° to 600°C; and surface areas of 711 and 1590 m^{2} per gram of material, respectively.

== Synthesis ==
There are different methods to make reticular materials. These methods—called synthesis methods—include for example chemical, solvo-/hydro-thermal, sonochemical, microwave-assisted, mechanochemical, ionothermal, sol-gel, and electrochemical. According to a survey amongst scientists, the dominating method is still solvothermal but with a pronounced shift towards room-temperature and hydrothermal synthesis.

In the solvothermal method, the reaction takes place by mixing and heating a metal salt, an organic linker and a solvent. To be more precise, the solvothermal or hydrothermal method is a process that involves conducting a chemical reaction under specific conditions of high temperatures and pressures, utilizing either aqueous or organic solvents as well as reactants to facilitate the reaction in a heterogeneous system.

Microwave-assisted, mechano-, and sol-gel synthesis are also common, while other methods, including electrochemical synthesis, are still at their emerging state. There is more and more focus on using eco-friendly (“green”, “sustainable”) and scalable production methods, in order to bring reticular materials to commercial use.

The different synthesis methods each have their advantages and disadvantages. Parameters to compare the different synthesis methods include for example process simplicity, energy consumption, reaction time, degree of control, cost, types of solvent used.

Different synthesis methods can produce different reticular materials even when starting from the same raw ingredients (reaction mixtures). The different methods will also lead to different reaction time, yields, particle size and morphology.

In classical synthetic routes, formamide-based solvents are commonly used both for synthesis and washing of MOFs particles. However, these are hard to remove from the pore structure and are hazardous both for human health and the environment. Newer, “greener” synthesis methods focus on minimizing or eliminating the use of harmful solvents, reducing energy consumption, and employing sustainable raw materials.

For example, the electrochemical method was patented by BASF in 2004 (for HKUST-1, also known as MOF-199). This was followed by the microwave-assisted method in 2005 for MIL-100, and then the mechanochemical approach in 2006 for [Cu(INA)2] and the ultrasound-assisted (sonochemical) method in 2008 for MOF-1 synthesis.

=== Research trends ===
Scientists increasingly stress the importance of green or sustainable synthesis techniques, where environmental aspects of the synthesis methods are taken into consideration to a greater extent than before. Environmental aspects include the use of sustainable resources (water instead of more toxic organic solvents, earth-abundant transition metals instead of expensive precious metals, use of organic linkers derived from biomass, etc.), carrying out reactions under mild conditions, thus limiting energy consumption, reducing the amount of waste produced, using safer chemical products, etc.

Artificial intelligence is another research trend for reticular materials. Some scientists call this digital reticular chemistry or the digital discovery cycle. The combination of laboratory robotics and artificial intelligence can conduct large-scale experiments that involve both the synthesis and characterization of structures within a feasible time frame.

== Characterization methods ==
After synthesis, chemists use a range of techniques to measure many different properties of the produced reticular material.

The reason why characterization is necessary is because the synthesis of reticular materials typically results in a polydisperse product that is highly sensitive to even minor changes in the reaction mixture. A multitude of factors can affect the outcome, leading to variations in the properties related to the physical and chemical characteristics of reticular materials. The most appropriate method to use will depend on the specific characteristics of the particles being studied.

Parameters to be determined and their possible characterization methods include for example the following:

- Shape or configuration: SEM/TEM, XRD/SAXS, AFM
- Size distribution: DLS/SLS/FCS, NTA, SEC
- Porosity: BET surface area, DSC Thermo-Porosimetry
- Surface charge (electrical charge on the surface): TRPS, electrophoretic light scattering
- Imaging: iDPC-STEM
- Shape of nanoparticles when they are immersed in a liquid medium: Atomic Force Microscopy (AFM) in tapping mode, Small-Angle X-ray Scattering (SAXS) and Analytical Ultracentrifugation (AUC).

== Applications ==
At first, owing to exceptionally high surface area, mostly gas adsorption/storage applications of MOFs were the subject of interest, followed later by other fields such as catalysis, biomedicine, and membrane technologies.

For example, the Nobel Prize committee in 2025 listed these possible application areas for reticular materials: “gas storage, analytical chemistry and (bio)sensors, batteries and fuel cell technology, separation science, synthesis and catalysis, harvesting of water from dry (low humidity) air, water purification and environmental remediation, capture/destruction of harmful agents, energy conversion and storage, hydrogen generation, food safety, drug delivery and diagnostics/therapy, etc.” The technology readiness levels vary widely between all these possible applications.

Other reviews have listed additional possible applications as follows: gas sensing, carbon dioxide capture, hydrogen production, environmental remediation, non-linear optics, energy storage, molecular recognition, diagnosis and ionic conduction.

=== Carbon capture ===
Reticular materials ‒ in particular COFs ‒ can be used for carbon capture technologies. Their robustness and their ability to adsorb large volumes of gases make them suitable for trapping carbon dioxide (CO_{2}). Reticular materials for CO_{2} capture have the ability to selectively adsorb and capture carbon dioxide molecules from the atmosphere or from industrial exhaust gases. The former process is called direct air capture, the latter is called post-combustion carbon capture. Cost efficiency is an ongoing concern for any of these carbon capture processes, whether it is done with or without reticular materials.

For example, MOF-200 and MOF-210 can take up 2400 mg of CO₂ per gram.

The Canadian company Svante is using CALF-20, a MOF, in their carbon capture process at pilot-scale (to reduce CO_{2} emissions from a cement plant in Richmond, British Columbia).

Conventional materials used in direct air capture (DAC) systems, such as liquid alkaline solutions and silica-supported amines, face significant challenges. These include high energy requirements for regeneration and toxicity issues. MOFs offer some advantages in these aspects. However, both MOFs and silica-supported amines continue to struggle with hydrolysis and the loss of amines during repeated use.

Scientists have synthesized COF-999 and are researching its use for direct air capture—the process of extracting CO₂ directly from ambient air. COF-999 is a porous, crystalline COF. In small-scale outdoor tests in Berkeley, California (where the ambient air had 400 ppm CO₂) test results showed that COF-999 had a CO₂ uptake capacity of 0.96 mmol/g under dry conditions. The uptake was even higher at 50% relative humidity: 2.05 mmol/g. Over 100 adsorption–desorption cycles and a 20-day operational period, the material showed high cycling stability, rapid CO₂ absorption, and a relatively low regeneration temperature of only 60°C.

=== Gas separation and storage ===
Reticular materials are well-suited for gas separation and storage, owing to their highly porous structures and the ability to selectively adsorb specific gases. This application is for example interesting for the energy sector, where efficient hydrogen storage is an essential element for clean fuel approaches.

The current state of reticular chemistry enables the synthesis of a wide range of highly porous nanomaterials for gas separation, including MOFs, COFs, porous organic cages (POCs), metal-organic cages (MOCs), and polyhedra (MOPs). The fact that pore geometry and volume of reticular materials can be adjusted (“is tunable”) is an advantage of reticular materials for gas storage applications. Reticular materials can also be integrated into membranes for energy-efficient gas separation processes.

=== Hydrogen storage ===
Due to the low volumetric density of hydrogen gas, efficient and cost-effective storage of hydrogen remains a challenge. To overcome this challenge, storage in solid adsorbents is an interesting alternative to compression in high-pressure tanks or cryogenic liquid. Adsorbents have the potential to match or surpass the capacities typical of physical storage systems, while doing so at lower pressures and with the potential to reduce cost.

Scientists are investigating many different MOFs and COFs to find those that are best for storing hydrogen. The aim is to be able to store hydrogen at ambient temperature and moderate pressures. MOFs under investigation for this application include for example MOF-5, IRMOF-6, IRMOF-8 and MOF-177.

IRMOF-20 was demonstrated experimentally to exhibit an uncommon combination of high usable volumetric (UV) and gravimetric capacities. Importantly, the measured capacities exceeded those of the benchmark compound MOF-5, the previous record-holder for combined volumetric/gravimetric performance. MOF-5 can “store up to 4.5 wt% of hydrogen at 77 K and 1 atm”.

NU-1501 is a zirconium-based, ultrahigh-surface-area MOF developed at Northwestern University in the United States (hence the NU prefix), by the research group led by Omar Farha. It can “store and release hydrogen at normal pressure”.

Research is ongoing for post-modification approaches, for example catenation and metal doping, that aim to increase the hydrogen uptake in nanoporous materials.

=== Atmospheric water harvesting ===
The ability of reticular materials to adsorb and desorb water molecules from air makes them suitable for technologies for atmospheric water harvesting (AWH) or generation (AWG). Another term for this technology is adsorption-based water harvesting. This process extracts moisture from the air to provide clean water, which could be of interest especially for arid regions.

By selecting the desired sorbent characteristics (e.g., shape and step position of the isotherm, saturation capacity, and binding energy), water harvesting can work even in low relative humidity (RH) conditions. Scientists have demonstrated that MOFs are a suitable sorbent because these materials can capture more water and require lower regeneration temperatures for its release compared to conventional sorbents (e.g., zeolites/silica gels or liquid brines).

A trial in 2018 in Tempe, Arizona (United States) used MOF-801 for atmospheric water harvesting. MOF-801 was chosen in the study because it exhibits an adsorption step located around 20% RH and is well-suited for the specific climate tested. The trial involved a single daily cycle where adsorption occurs during night-time at a higher humidity (20–40% RH) and desorption/water production occurs during day-time at a lower humidity (10–20% RH). The device consisted of two key components, an adsorbent layer (MOF) and an air-cooled condenser in an enclosure. Tests showed that the metal ions and organic linkers of the MOF material did not contaminate the produced water.

MOF-303 is also a suitable material for atmospheric water harvesting. This MOF is built from rod-like aluminum-oxide secondary building units together with aligned pyrazolate linkers; these components generate pores lined with alternating hydrophilic and hydrophobic pockets.

The University of Berkeley is trialling (in 2025) another MOF for atmospheric water harvesting, called MOF-LA2-1. Compared with MOF-303, extending the organic linker by two carbon atoms increases water uptake by approximately 50%. The modified linkers create a more hydrophobic pore environment, allowing adsorbed water to be released at lower temperatures and thus making the whole process more energy-efficient. The start-up company Atoco is developing on-grid and off-grid prototypes to produce drinking water with this technology.

In 2019, experts recruited by IUPAC (International Union of Pure and Applied Chemistry) selected the technology MOFs and porous materials for water harvesting as one of the Top Ten Emerging Technologies in Chemistry.

=== Further applications ===
The range of application ideas for reticular materials is vast and growing. Examples of novel applications that scientists are currently investigating include:

- Biomedicine: Reticular materials, particularly MOFs, are being tested for a variety of use-cases in the biomedical field, for example drug delivery systems, biosensor platforms or photodynamic therapy. MOFs are also under investigation for medical imaging and diagnostic purposes. For example, scientists add contrast agents to MOFs and then use them for magnetic resonance imaging (MRI) or computed tomography (CT). Nano-MOFs are MOFs at the nanoscale with small sizes and high level of biocompatibility. They are also under investigation for therapeutic activities, for example for cancer treatment.
- Sensor technology: There is an increasing number of patents for new MOFs with sensing properties and sensing devices integrating MOFs. These sensors can be employed in a variety of applications, from environmental monitoring to industrial safety, providing real-time data for detecting pollutants, toxic gases, or changes in environmental conditions. The use of reticular materials in sensor technologies is rapidly expanding due to their ability to selectively adsorb and interact with various gases, liquids, and ions. MOFs are effective in detecting and measuring specific substances in the environment.
- Electronics: The electronics industry can now use MOF materials to contain some of the toxic gases required to produce semiconductors. Reticular materials are used in the development of advanced electronic devices. This includes flexible and high-performance components such as capacitors, transistors, and photodetectors.
- Electrochemical applications: their generally low electrical conductivity limits the broad use of MOFs in electrochemical applications.
- Energy storage: MOFs are being explored for their application in both supercapacitors (SCs) and metal-ion batteries.
- Photocatalysis: MOFs have garnered attention in photocatalysis‒harnessing light energy to propel chemical reactions. MOFs' extensive surface area and porosity provide numerous active sites for catalytic reactions.
- Removal of pollutants (for example crude oil and antibiotics) from water by using MIL-101 as a catalyst; another example is the removal of PFAS from water by using UiO-67 in an absorption process.
- Extracting rare-earth elements from wastewater by using ZIF-8.
- Methane adsorption and storage with the aluminium framework Al-soc-MOF-1.
- MOF–textile composites for personal protection: MOFs can adsorb hazardous gases and chemicals, including chemical warfare agents, industrial chemicals, and other toxic compounds. They can therefore be used in personal protective equipment (PPE).

== Industrial production and commercial use ==
=== Upscaling processes ===
While thousands of reticular materials have been synthesized in laboratories and tested for small-scale applications, the primary challenge lies in scaling up the most promising candidates for commercialization..

The key leading industrial areas for reticular materials are CO_{2} capture and oil/natural gas industry. This is expected as these areas are in highest demand, and the high surface areas and tunable porosity of reticular materials are useful here.

The commercialization of reticular materials requires optimizing and scale-up of the synthesis optimization, processability enhancement, and introducing reticular materials into industrial cycles (such as gas storage, CO_{2} capture, water harvesting). More than 100,000 MOF structures have already been synthesized but only a few of them are finding their place in industrial and daily life applications. Greener and cheaper synthesis routes would make upscaling more attractive.

Starting from 2006, one by one, companies dedicated specifically to MOFs started to be established. The period 2015–2018 can be regarded as “a blooming period” with a maximum of 4–5 companies per year. The dominating type of companies to date are micro-sized (start-ups), which commonly take their origin in research institutions and universities. Some start-ups may grow to become larger-size companies.

To date, the most representative commercially available MOFs are Basolite A520 (produced by BASF), CALF-20, SENTINEL-110 for natural gas storage, CO_{2} capture, and chemical protection, respectively.

=== Hindering factors ===
When reticular materials are being commercialized, the focus of research changes from how to synthesize a reticular material to how to manufacture a reticular material economically. The focus is therefore on a production process at low cost, with high yield, and in a safe and sustainable manner. The synthesis of MOFs is often complicated, requiring pricey reagents; large-scale production is economically challenging. For instance, the price for the production of MOFs can be as high as $50 per gram, which is very expensive compared with conventional porous materials like activated carbon with a price of around $1 per kilogram.

Around 99 thousand synthetic variants of MOF are known. This enormous number of possible MOF structures makes it challenging and cumbersome to identify and optimize MOFs for a given application with certain desired properties. This leads to long experimental cycles and a high R&D cost. Even for very promising materials like CALF-20 and MIL-100(Fe), multi-ton scale syntheses were achieved only recently. The transformation from lab scale to industrial scale production is slow.

A review from 2025 has identified the three main hindering factors for the translation of lab results to industry to be: scalability, high costs of reticular materials, and missing networks between academia and industry. Other notable barriers included reproducibility and poor technology readiness level. High production costs due to complex synthesis processes can act as barriers to widespread technology deployment.

Scalability is a fundamental challenge in translating lab-scale findings to industrial processes. The difficulty may lie in the variability for certain syntheses that may be successful in a small batch (lab scale) but face entirely different challenges when the innovations need to be scaled up (industrial scale).

Potentially toxic, harmful, and sheer volume of solvent waste streams that are less of a concern in a small lab scale but might be a deciding factor during the industrial scale-up. Furthermore, the high costs associated with reticular materials (metal salts and specialized linkers) to target a specific application present a significant barrier to their widespread adoption. Reducing these costs requires advancements in synthesis methods and economies of scale.

Most MOFs are currently produced as a powder product, which has significant handling, toxicity, and processability issues. Therefore, there are many research efforts focused on the production of MOFs in dispersed forms, including pellets, gels, membranes, or films, as in the case of a patented Zn, Fe, Cu, or Cd-MOF films used to improve the performance of a chloroform gas QCM sensor, or a patented fluorescent ink based on MOFs.

=== Examples of companies ===
While BASF has not invented any new MOFs, their key contribution has been the scaling of the production of raw MOFs. BASF has created a pathway for the commercial adaptation of MOFs, both focusing on synthesis scale-up and real-world applications. BASF currently has a portfolio of various MOFs sold under the trade name Basolite. The hydrothermal synthesis (at the tonne level) of Basolite A520 has been fully optimized. BASF has developed an electrochemical method for the industrial preparation of HKUST-1 (US8163949B2 patent). For example, in 2026 BASF is collaborating with Canadian company Svante Technologies Inc., a company that works on carbon capture and removal.

Examples of start-up companies that are producing reticular materials, performing R&D in this field, or selling products and processes based on reticular materials include (in alphabetical order):

- AirJoule (Newark, Delaware, United States, founded in 2018) - producing and applying MOFs together with BASF for atmospheric water harvesting for various applications including data centers.
- Atoco (Irvine, California, United States, founded in 2020 by Omar M. Yaghi, the pioneer of reticular materials) - developing molecularly engineered reticular materials for atmospheric water harvesting and CO₂ capture. The company’s off-grid atmospheric water harvesting units are “powered entirely by ultra-low-grade thermal energy” and “produce potable water directly where it is needed”, even in dry regions at low humidities. The first commercial off-grid atmospheric water harvesting units will generate up to 1,000 liters per day; the first commercial on-grid units, utilizing low amounts of electricity, will generate up to 4,000 liters of water per day. Atoco uses reticular materials for carbon dioxide removal from ambient air and from industrial emissions.
- EnergyX (San Juan, Puerto Rico, founded in 2018) - using membranes to extract lithium from brine pools (however, the company has now moved away from MOF-based membranes, as of 2022).
- H2MOF (Irvine, California, United States, founded in 2021) - developing MOF-based technology for storage of hydrogen gas in solid state at low pressure (20-100 bar) and near-ambient temperatures. This technology can be used for fuel cells and other hydrogen-based energy systems. The aim is to “provide safe and cost-effective hydrogen storage and transportation.” Two of the company’s founders are Nobel Prize laureates: Omar M. Yaghi (reticular chemistry pioneer), and Fraser Stoddart (artificial molecular machinery pioneer).
- novoMOF (Switzerland, founded in 2017) - Founded as a spinout from the Swiss Paul Scherrer Institute (PSI), novoMOF develops metal-organic frameworks (MOFs) for a variety of applications, including point-source CO₂ capture.
- Nuada (United Kingdom; registered trademark of MOF Technologies Ltd.) - working on carbon capture technology with MOFs to reduce greenhouse gas emissions from lime production. As of 2026, there is an ongoing trial at a waste-to-energy facility together with MLC at MLC’s Singleton Birch site in Melton Ross, North Lincolnshire.
- Poradigm Technology (founded in 2017 in Belfast, Northern Ireland; formerly called Porous Liquid Technologies); producing porous liquid technologies for CO_{2} and noble gas capture and hydrocarbon separation.
- Numat (United States) - a mature company that is equipped to upscale and tailor MOFs to targeted applications. Producing specialist filtration materials, for example “gas mask filters that can capture and destroy chemical warfare agents”. This technology can provide “chemical protection to military, medical, and industrial first responders.“
- Vector Bioscience Cambridge (United Kingdom) - a spinout for the commercialization of MOFs in healthcare applications.
- Yocof Material Co. Ltd. (China, founded in 2023) - focusing on the production of COFs sorbents or “super adsorbents”.

== See also ==
- Alfred Werner - developed the basis for modern coordination chemistry
- Hypothetical zeolite
- Reticular Chemistry Structure Resource
