= Imidazolate =

Ion

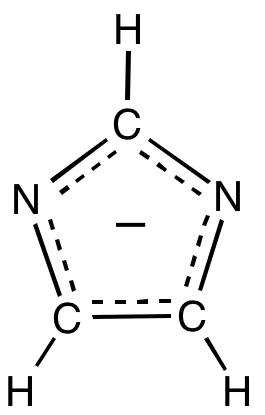

Names
- IUPAC name Imidazolate
- Other names Imidazolide

Identifiers
CAS Number	36954-03-7
3D model (JSmol)	Interactive image; Interactive image
ChemSpider	2631931
PubChem CID	4605971 Na salt; 12796790 K salt; 15977602 Zn salt; 129690082 Cu salt
CompTox Dashboard (EPA)	DTXSID201032745
- InChI: InChI=1S/C3H4N2/c1-2-5-3-4-1/h1-4H/q-1 Key: LFLLXPLNBAQRCY-UHFFFAOYSA-N; InChI=1S/C3H3N2/c1-2-5-3-4-1/h1-3H/q-1 Key: JBFYUZGYRGXSFL-UHFFFAOYSA-N
- SMILES: c1cnc[n-]1; c1c[n-]cn1

Properties
Chemical formula	C_{3}H_{3}N_{2}^{−}
Molar mass	67.070 g/mol
Acidity (pK_{a})	14.05

Thermochemistry
Std enthalpy of formation (Δ_{f}H^{⦵}_{298})	67.8 kJ·mol^{−1} (16.2 kcal·mol^{−1}) Gas phase.
- Except where otherwise noted, data are given for materials in their standard state (at 25 °C [77 °F], 100 kPa). Infobox references

Imidazolate (C_{3}H_{3}N^{−}_{2}) is the conjugate base of imidazole. It is a nucleophile and a strong base. The free anion has C_{2v} symmetry. Imidazole has a pK_{a} of 14.05, so the deprotonation of imidazole (C_{3}H_{3}N_{2}H) requires a strong base.

== Occurrence ==
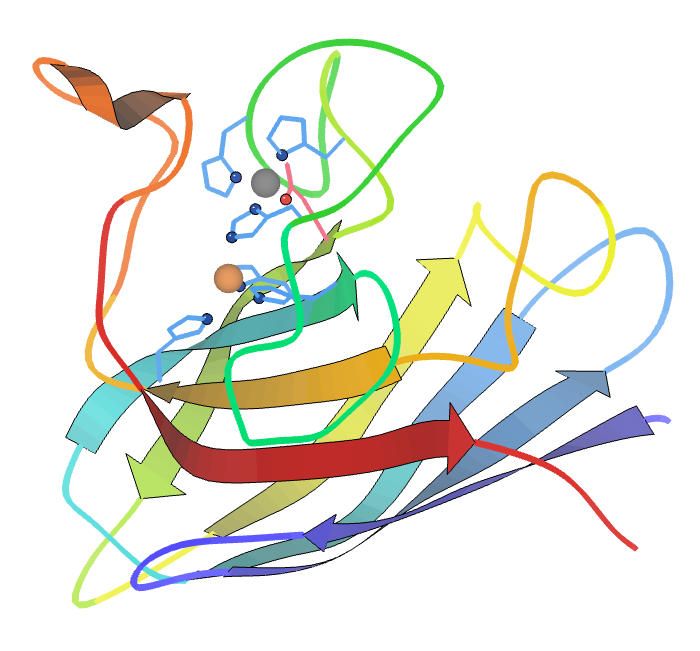
In the human SOD1 enzyme (N-terminus = blue, C-terminus = red), the copper (orange sphere) and zinc (grey one) are bridged by imidazolate.

Imidazolate is a common bridging ligand in coordination chemistry. In the zeolitic imidazolate frameworks, the metals are interconnected via imidazolates. In the enzyme superoxide dismutase, imidazolate links copper and zinc centers.
