= Michael A. O'Keefe =

Australian physicist

Michael A. O'Keefe (born 8 September 1942, in East Melbourne, Australia) is a physicist who has worked in materials science and electron microscopy. He is perhaps best known for his production of the seminal computer code for modeling of high-resolution transmission electron microscopy (HRTEM) images; his software was later made available as part of the DeepView package for remote electron microscopy and control. O'Keefe's tutorial on theory and application of high-resolution electron microscope image simulation is available online.

O'Keefe has established methods of quantifying resolution quality, and methods of deriving accurate atom positions from high-resolution images. He used these methods to help establish high-resolution electron microscopy as a precise science; in addition to its more-pedestrian role of pictorial confirmation of nano measurements, he demonstrated HRTEM's value in measurement of nano-properties. The video and associated slides illustrate the role of his work in providing tools for nano-characterization.

O'Keefe designed and developed the one-Ångström microscope (OÅM) for the National Center for Electron Microscopy at Lawrence Berkeley National Laboratory based on an FEI Company CM300 microscope that he modified extensively to improve coherence and correct three-fold astigmatism. He was successful in breaking the "one-Ångström barrier" to resolution using his combination of hardware and software correction of microscope aberrations. He produced the first HRTEM images to show carbon atoms separated by less than one Ångström in diamond (0.89 Å) and silicon atoms in crystalline silicon (0.78 Å)—an example of his silicon work appears on a webpage at the Department of Energy. His OÅM was the first HRTEM able to image the smallest metal atoms (lithium) in lithium battery materials. Building on his work designing and operating his one-Ångström microscope (OÅM), O'Keefe produced the design for the LBNL TEAM (transmission electron aspheric microscope) able to resolve atoms in the deep sub-Ångström resolution region (less than 0.5 Å) using a hardware electron-wave phase-corrector (Cs corrector) in combination with a coherence-enhancing electron-beam monochromator.

O'Keefe was elected president of the Microscopy Society of America in 2007.
