= MOF-5 =

Metal–organic framework

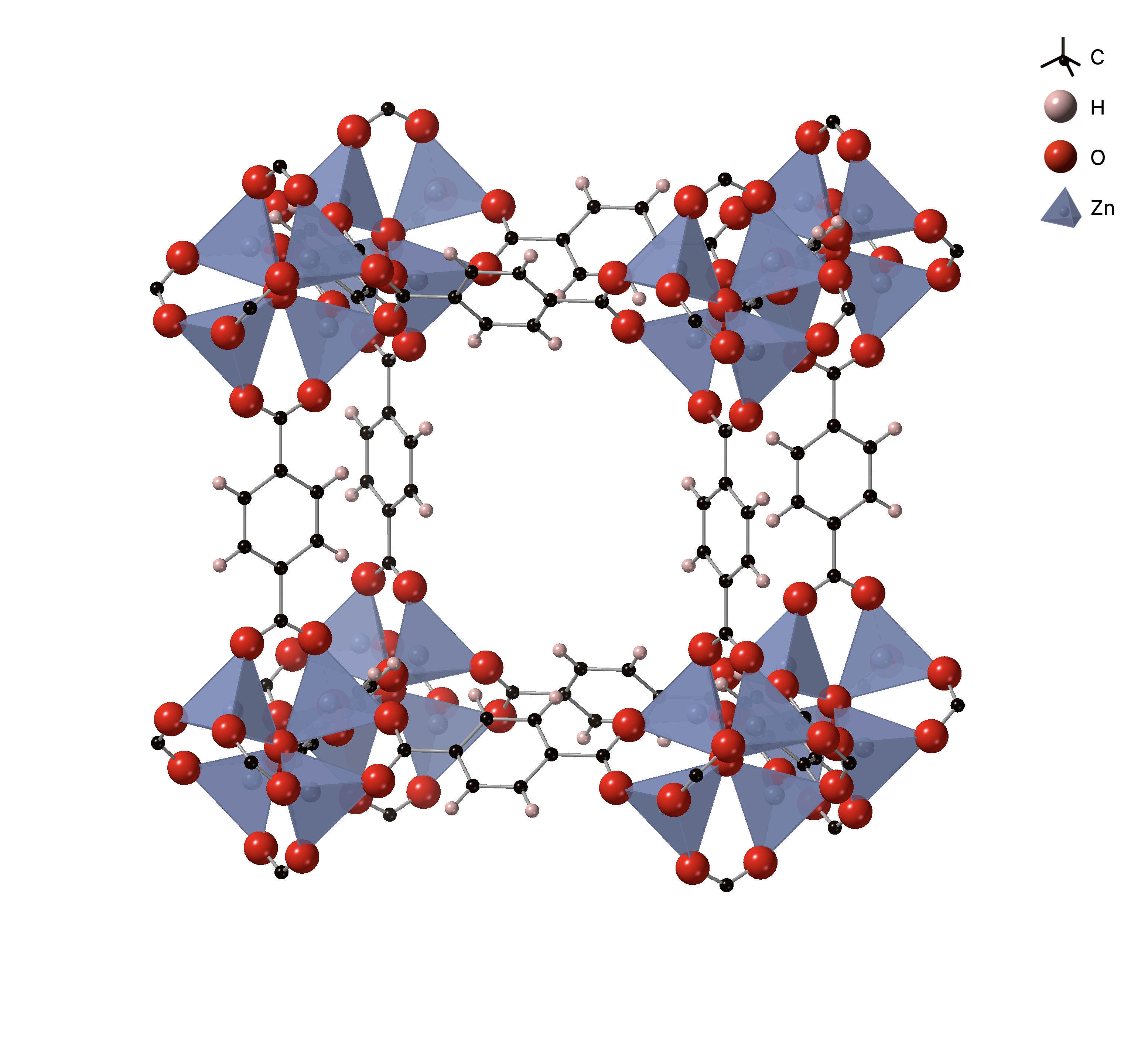
Crystal structure of MOF-5. A JSmol visualization can be found here

MOF-5 or IRMOF-1 is a cubic metal–organic framework compound with the formula Zn_{4}O(BDC)_{3}, where BDC^{2−} = 1,4-benzodicarboxylate (MOF-5). It was first synthesized in the lab of Omar M. Yaghi. MOF-5 is notable for exhibiting one of the highest surface area to volume ratios among metal–organic frameworks, at 2200 m^{2}/cm^{3}. Additionally, it was the first metal–organic framework studied for hydrogen gas storage.

Yaghi's work on MOF-5 is partially responsible for his 2025 Nobel Prize in Chemistry.
