= Zeolitic imidazolate framework =

Class of metal–organic frameworks

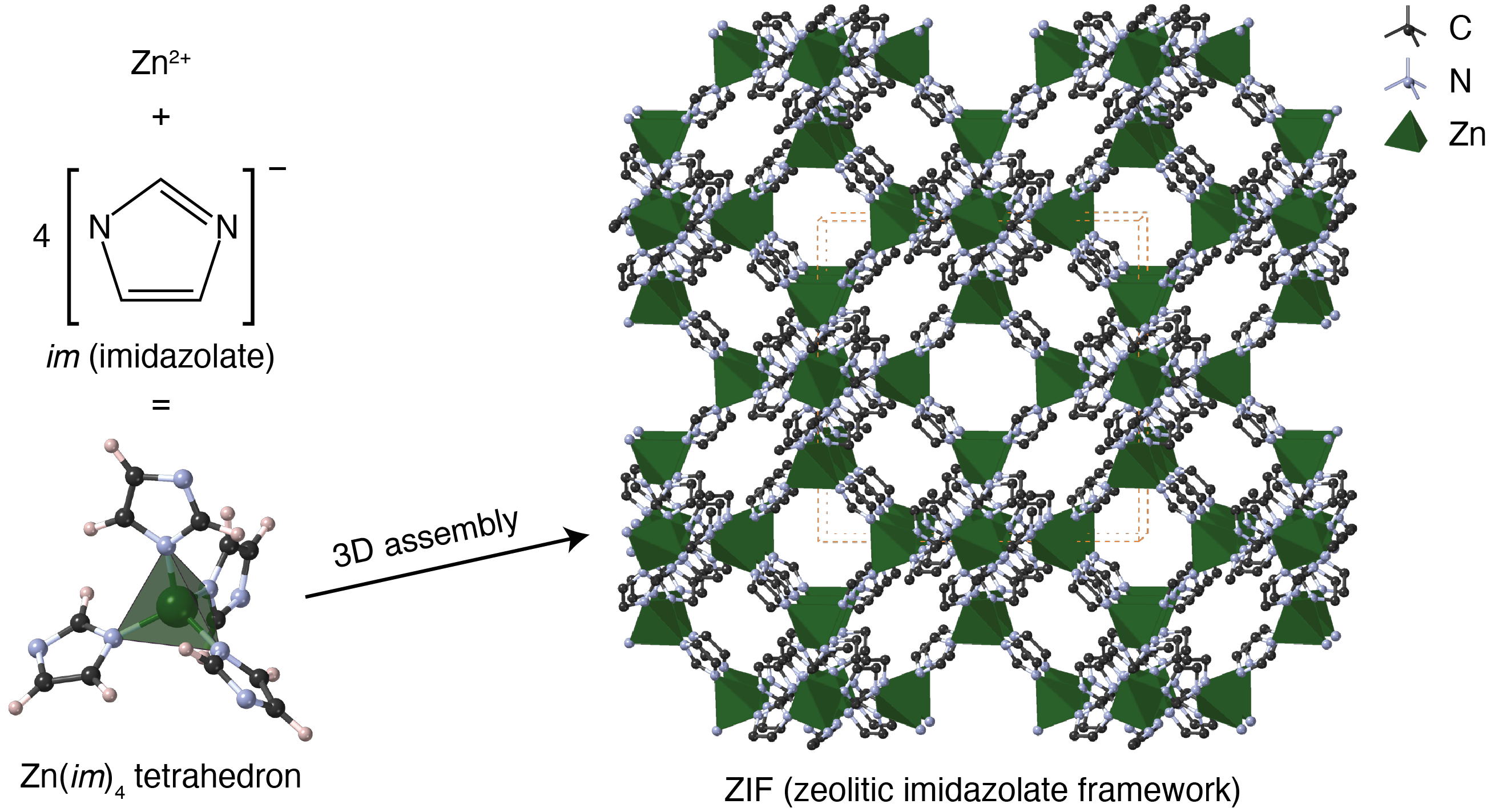
The structure of a zeolitic imidazolate framework is made through three-dimensional assembly of metal(imidazolate)4 tetrahedra.

Zeolitic imidazolate frameworks (ZIFs) are a class of metal–organic frameworks (MOFs) that are topologically isomorphic with zeolites. ZIFs are composed of tetrahedrally-coordinated transition metal ions (e.g. Fe, Co, Zn) connected by imidazolate linkers. Since the metal-imidazole-metal angle is similar to the 145° Si–O–Si angle in zeolites, ZIFs have zeolite-like topologies. As of 2010, 105 ZIF topologies have been reported in the literature. Due to their robust porosity, resistance to thermal changes, and chemical stability, ZIFs are being investigated for applications such as carbon dioxide capture.

ZIF glasses can be synthesized by the melt-quench method, and the first melt-quenched ZIF glass was firstly made and reported by Bennett et al. back in 2015. ZIFs remain porous even after forming glasses, recent studies have revealed that the linker modification can really modulate the melting behaviour of ZIFs. ZIF glasses are a newly discovered type of material that has been garnering increasing interest in recent years, with around 13 different ZIFs, including ZIF-4, ZIF-62, and ZIF-76, being successfully prepared in their glassy state. In traditional materials science, glasses can be divided into three major families: inorganic, organic, and metallic. The chemical bonds that make up the structure of members of each family are mixed ionic/covalent bonds, covalent bonds, and metallic bonds, respectively. ZIF glasses, on the other hand, are an organic-inorganic coordinated glass discovered only recently, and have a completely different structure than the three traditional glass families. They thus represent a fourth type of glass.

== History ==
In 2006, Omar M. Yaghi and his collaborators published a series of Zeolitic imidazolate frameworks (ZIFs), including ZIF-8, building on his pioneering work in metal–organic frameworks (MOFs). Yaghi introduced ZIFs as a novel class of materials that combined the structural characteristics of zeolites — such as their tetrahedral coordination and robust chemical stability— with the tunability and porosity of MOFs. By linking metal ions (typically zinc or cobalt) with imidazolate linkers, ZIFs achieved the zeolite-like topology while maintaining the modularity and versatility of MOF chemistry. This innovation significantly broadened the potential applications of porous materials in areas such as gas storage, separation, and catalysis.

The breakthrough material ZIF-8, composed of zinc ions and 2-methylimidazolate linkers, exemplifies the unique properties of ZIFs. ZIF-8 demonstrated exceptional chemical and thermal stability, coupled with a highly selective pore system, making it suitable for demanding applications like carbon dioxide capture and hydrocarbon separation. The introduction of ZIFs not only expanded the capabilities of MOFs but also bridged the gap between traditional zeolites and modern framework materials, solidifying Yaghi’s reputation in the development of advanced porous materials.

== Glassy structure ==
The structure of melt-quenched ZIF glasses maintains a certain amount of short-range order, although the chemical configuration and coordination environments, after melting, lose long-range order completely. From a microscopic view, the linkages between metal nodes and organic ligands (e.g., Zn-N linkages) partially break at high temperature and the resulting undercoordinated metal ions have the potential to link with other neighboring organic ligands for exchange.

One notable discovery regarding the structure of ZIF glass was made by Rasmus et al. Before this research was published, the short-range structural order at the scale of the cation-ligand units remained unknown given the limitations of the analytical techniques available. The short-range structural disorder of the tetrahedral ligand environment around metal nodes in the ZIF glass was detected for the first time by performing zinc-67 nuclear magnetic resonance. This finding clearly showed that ZIF glasses are structurally very different from the other known glass types, overturning the traditional view that a glass structure has short-range order and long-range disorder, providing a broader view of what qualifies as a glass.

== Synthesis ==
ZIFs are mainly prepared by solvothermal or hydrothermal techniques. Crystals slowly grow from a heated solution of a hydrated metal salt, an ImH (imidazole with acidic proton), a solvent, and base. Functionalized ImH linkers allow for control of ZIF structure. This process is ideal for generating monocrystalline materials for single-crystal X-ray diffraction. A wide range of solvents, bases, and conditions have been explored, with an eye towards improving crystal functionality, morphology, and dispersity. Prototypically, an amide solvent such as N,N-dimethylformamide (DMF) is used. The heat applied decomposes the amide solvent to generate amines, which in turn generate the imidazolate from the imidazole species. Methanol, ethanol, isopropanol, and water have also been explored as alternative solvents for ZIF formation but require bases such as pyridine, TEA, sodium formate, and NaOH. Polymers such as poly(ethylene oxide)–poly(propylene oxide)–poly(ethylene oxide), polyvinylpyrrolidone, and poly-(diallyldimethylammonium chloride) have been found to act as crystal dispersants, imparting particle-size and morphology control.

Due to their promising material properties, significant interest lies in economical large-scale production methods. Sonochemical synthesis, which allows nucleation reactions to proceed rapidly through acoustic generation of localized heat and pressure, has been explored as a way to shorten synthesis times. As with the case of zeolites, microwave-assisted synthesis has also been of interest for the rapid synthesis of ZIFs. Both methods have been shown to reduce reaction times from days to hours, or from hours to minutes. Solvent-free methods, such as ball-milling or chemical vapor deposition, have also been described to produce high-quality ZIF-8. Chemical vapor deposition is of particular promise due to the high degree of uniformity and aspect ratio control it can offer, and its ability to be integrated into traditional lithographic workflows for functional thin films (e.g. microelectronics). Environmentally-friendly synthesis based on supercritical carbon dioxide (scCO_{2}) have been also reported as a feasible procedure for the preparation of ZIF-8 at an industrial scale. Working under stoichiometric conditions, ZIF-8 could be obtained in 10 hours and does not require the use of ligand excess, additives, organic solvents or cleaning steps.

Using the traditional melt-quench of metals or sintering of ceramics would cause the collapse of MOF structure as its thermal decomposing temperature is lower than its melting temperature. Moreover, the amorphous form of MOF can be achieved through pressurization or heating, but its network feature would be significantly broken during the amorphization process. Bennett et al found certain members from MOF family (ZIF-4, etc.) can be made into a glassy state. Those carefully selected ZIF crystals are able to form a glassy solid after heating and cooling in an argon atmosphere. Moreover, the melting range can be tuned by their network topologies.

== Potential applications ==
The crystal form of ZIF, or MOF in general, is known for its porosity, but is difficult to mass-produce and incorporate in actual applications due to unavoidable intercrystalline defects. Even more recent study has shown that ZIFs' porosity can be precisely tuned by applying adequate pressures through linker functionalization, for example ZIF-62 shows a continuous phase transition from open pore (op) to close pore (cp) phase with increasing the bim^{−} concentration over 0.35 per formular unit. Almost half of the porosity remains after melting. There are several interesting characters about ZIF glasses addressing those challenges to potentially realize promised applications achievable. The first intriguing one is that ZIF glass maintains the porous structure as its crystalline form after melt-quench process, which means it can be applied for applications such as gas separation and storage. The glassy form would also offer unique opportunities for easy processability and mass production. Last but not least, besides pure ZIF glass, composites based on it by tuning the composition and structure has the distinct advantage of a broad design space.

=== Applications to carbon capture ===
ZIFs exhibit some properties relevant to carbon dioxide capture, while commercial technology still centers around amine solvents.

Zeolites are known to have tunable pores – ranging between 3–12 angstroms – which allows them to separate carbon dioxide. Because a $\ce{CO2}$ molecule is about 5.4 angstroms in length, zeolites with a pore size of 4–5 angstroms can be well-suited for carbon dioxide capture. However, other factors also need to be considered when determining how effective zeolites will be at carbon dioxide capture. The first is basicity, which can be created by doing an alkali metal cation exchange. The second is the Si/Al ratio which impacts the cation exchange capacity. To get a higher adsorption capacity, there must be a lower Si/Al ratio in order to increase the cation exchange capacity.

ZIFs 68, 69, 70, 78, 81, 82, 95, and 100 have been found to have very high uptake capacity, meaning that they can store a lot of carbon dioxide, though their affinity to it is not always strong. Of those, 68, 69, and 70 show high affinities for carbon dioxide, evidenced by their adsorption isotherms, which show steep uptakes at low pressures. One liter of ZIF can hold 83 liters of CO_{2}. This could also be useful for pressure-swing adsorption.

=== Gas separation ===
ZIF-62 was made into a glassy membrane on the nanoporous alumina support for gas separation for the first time by Yuhan et al in 2020. The vitrification process effectively eliminates grain boundaries formation within the glass, and the molecular sieving ability of such membrane is significantly improved. The value of the ideal selectivities of several gas pairs, e.g. CO_{2}/N_{2}, are much higher than Knudsen selectivities, and the excellent performance of the ZIF-62 glass membrane not only far exceeds the Robeson upper bound, but also exceeds most of other pure polycrystalline MOF materials reported so far.

=== Other separation applications ===
Much ZIF research focuses on the separation of hydrogen and carbon dioxide because a well-studied ZIF, ZIF-8, has a very high separation factor for hydrogen and carbon dioxide mixtures. It is also very good for the separation of hydrocarbon mixtures, like the following:

- Ethane-propane = 80
- Ethylene- propylene = 10
- Ethylene- propane = 167

In addition to gas separations, ZIF’s have the potential to separate components of biofuels, specifically, water and ethanol. Of all of the ZIF’s that have been tested, ZIF-8 shows high selectivity. ZIF’s have also shown potential in separating other alcohols, like propanol and butanol, from water. Typically, water and ethanol (or other alcohols) are separated using distillation, however ZIF’s offer a potential lower-energy separation option.

=== Catalysis ===
ZIF’s also have great potential as heterogeneous catalysts; ZIF-8 has been shown to act as good catalysts for the transesterification of vegetable oils, the Friedel-Crafts acylation reaction between benzoyl chloride and anisole, and for the formation of carbonates. ZIF-8 nanoparticles can also be used to enhance the performance in the Knoevenagel condensation reaction between benzaldehyde and malononitrile. ZIF’s have also been shown to work well in oxidation and epoxidation reactions; ZIF-9 has been shown to catalyze the aerobic oxidation of tetralin and the oxidation of many other small molecules. It can also catalyze reactions to produce hydrogen at room temperature, specifically the dehydrogenation of dimethylamine borane and NaBH_{4} hydrolysis.

The table below gives a more comprehensive list of ZIF’s that can act as catalysts for different organic reactions.

ZIF Material	Additional Materials	Reaction (s) Catalyzed
ZIF-8	gold nanoparticles	Oxidation of CO Oxidation of aldehyde groups
ZIF-8	gold and silver core shell nanoparticles	Reduction of 4-nitrophenol
ZIF-8	gold, silver, and platinum nanoparticles	Oxidation of CO Hydrogenation of n-hexene
ZIF-8	platinum nanoparticles	Hydrogenation of alkene
ZIF-8	platinum and titanium dioxide nanotubes	Degradation of phenol
ZIF-8	palladium nanoparticles	Aminocarbonylation
ZIF-8	iridium nanoparticles	Hydrogenation of cyclohexene and phenylacetene
ZIF-8	ruthenium nanoparticles	Asymmetric hydrogenation of acetophonone
ZIF-8	iron oxide microspheres	Knoevenagel condensation
ZIF-8	Zn_{2}GeO_{4} nanorods	Conversion of CO_{2}
ZIF-65	Molybdenum Oxide	Degradation of methyl orange and orange II dyes

=== Sensing and electronic devices ===
ZIF’s are also good candidates for chemical sensors because of their tunable adsorbance properties. ZIF-8 exhibits sensitivity when exposed to the vapor of ethanol and water mixtures, and this response is dependent on the concentration of ethanol in the mixture. Additionally, ZIF’s are attractive materials for matrices for biosensors, like electrochemical biosensors, for in-vivo electrochemical measurements. They also have potential applications as luminescent probes for the detection of metal ions and small molecules. ZIF-8 luminescence is highly sensitive to $\ce{Cu2+}$, and $\ce{Cd2+}$ ions as well as acetone. ZIF nanoparticles can also sense fluorescently tagged single stranded pieces of DNA.

=== Drug delivery ===
Because ZIF’s are porous, chemically stable, thermally stable, and tunable, they are potentially a platform for drug delivery and controlled drug release. ZIF-8 is very stable in water and aqueous sodium hydroxide solutions but decompose quickly in acidic solutions, indicating a pH sensitivity that could aid in the development of ZIF-based drug-release platforms.

== Comparing ZIFs with other compounds ==
=== ZIFs vs MOFs ===
While ZIFs are a subset of the MOF hybrids that combine organic and metal frameworks to create hybrid microporous and crystalline structures, they are much more restricted in their structure. Similar to MOFs, most ZIF properties are largely dependent on the properties of the metal clusters, ligands, and synthesis conditions in which they were created.

Most ZIF alterations up to this point have involved changing the linkers — bridging O_{2} — anions and imidazolate-based ligands – or combining two types of linkers to change bond angles or pore size due to limitations in synthesizing methods and production. A large portion of changing linkers included adding functional groups with various polarities and symmetries to the imidazolate ligands to alter the ZIFs carbon dioxide adsorption ability without changing the transitional-metal cations. Compare this to MOFs, which have a much larger degree of variety in the types of their building units.

Despite these similarities with other MOFs, ZIFs have significant properties that distinguish these structures as uniquely applicable to carbon capture processes. Because ZIFs tend to resemble the crystalline framework of zeolites, their thermal and chemical stability are higher than those of other MOFs, allowing them to work at a wider range in temperatures, making them suitable to chemical processes.

Perhaps the most important difference is the ZIFs' hydrophobic properties and water stability. A main issue with zeolites and MOFs, to a certain extent, was their adsorption of water along with CO_{2}. Water vapor is often found in carbon-rich exhaust gases, and MOFs would absorb the water, lowering the amount of CO_{2} required to reach saturation. MOFs are also less stable in moist and oxygen-rich environments due to metal-oxygen bonds performing hydrolysis. ZIFs, however, have nearly identical performance in dry vs humid conditions, showing much higher CO_{2} selectivity over water, allowing the adsorbent to store more carbon before saturation is reached.

=== ZIFs vs commercially available products ===
Even in comparison with other materials, the ZIFs most attractive quality is still its hydrophobic properties. When compared to ZIFs in dry conditions, activated carbon was nearly identical with its uptake capacity. However, once the conditions were changed to wet, the activated carbon’s uptake was halved. When this saturation and regeneration tests were run at these conditions, ZIFs also showed minimal to no structural degradation, a good indication of the adsorbent’s re-usability.

However, ZIFs tend to be expensive to synthesize. MOFs require synthesis methods with long reaction periods, high pressures, and high temperatures, which aren’t methods that are easy to scale-up. ZIFs do tend to be more affordable than commercially available non-ZIF MOFs.

When combined with polymer-sorbent materials, research determined that hybrid polymer-ZIF sorbent membranes no longer following the upper bound of the Robeson plot, which is a plot of selectivity as a function of permeation for membrane gas separation.

== See also ==
- Metal–organic framework
- Covalent organic framework
- Omar M. Yaghi
- Zeolite
- Hydrogen-bonded organic framework
