= Omar M. Yaghi =

Chemist (born 1965)

- عمر ياغي
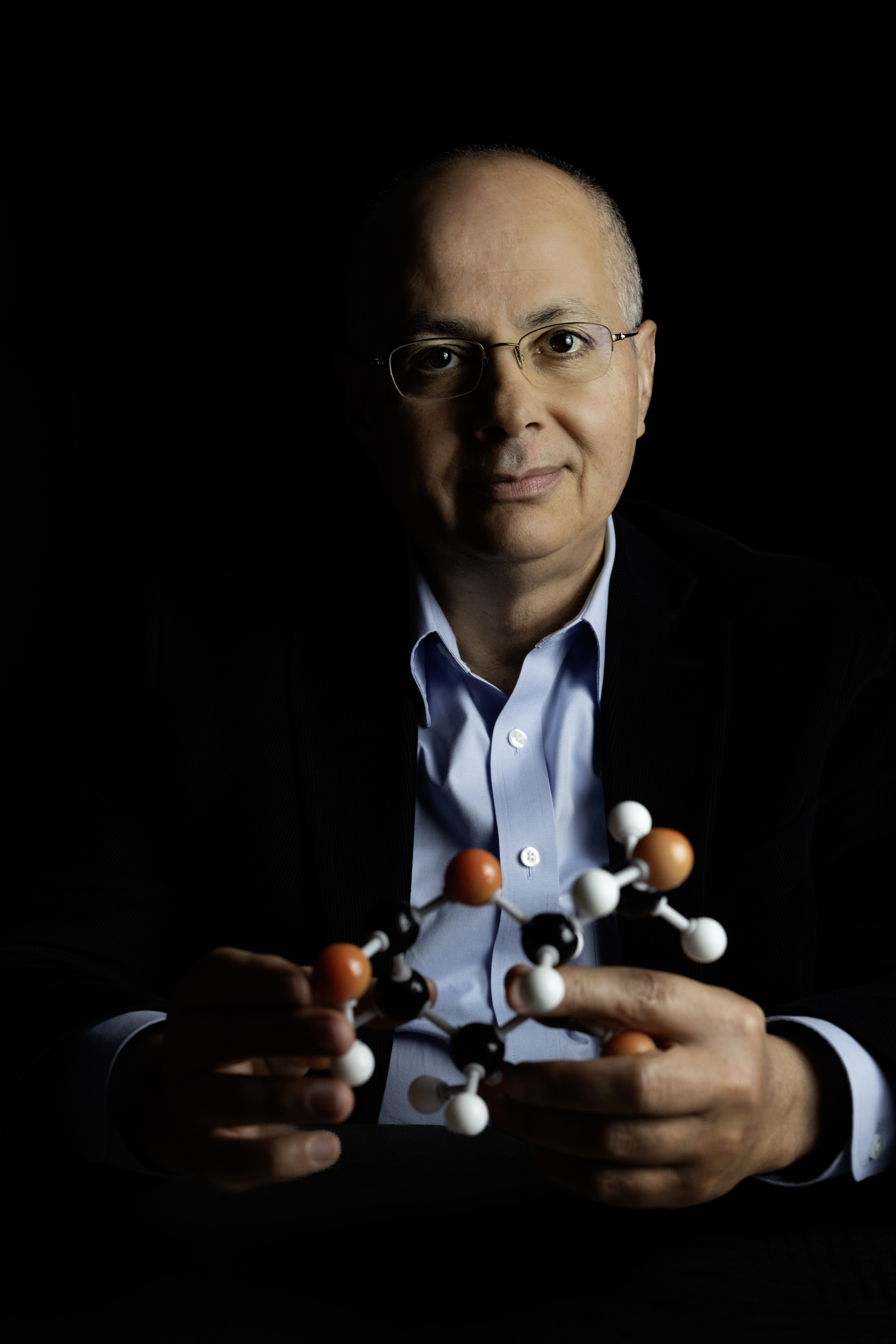
- Yaghi in 2025
- Born: Omar Mwannes Yaghi; February 9, 1965 (age 61); Amman, Jordan
- Citizenship: Jordanian; Saudi; American
- Education: Hudson Valley Community College (AS); University at Albany, SUNY (BS); University of Illinois, Urbana-Champaign (MS, PhD)
- Known for: Reticular chemistry Metal-organic frameworks
- Awards: List: Newcomb Cleveland Prize (2007); King Faisal International Prize (2015); Mustafa Prize (2015); Albert Einstein World Award of Science (2017); BBVA Foundation Frontiers of Knowledge Award (2018); Wolf Prize in Chemistry (2018); Prince Sultan bin Abdulaziz International Prize for Water (2018); ENI award (2018); Gregori Aminoff Prize (2019); VinFuture Prize (2022); Wilhelm Exner Medal (2023); Tang Prize (2024); Balzan Prize (2024); Nobel Prize in Chemistry (2025)
- Scientific career
- Fields: Chemistry
- Workplaces: List: Arizona State University, Tempe; University of Michigan; UC Los Angeles; UC Berkeley
- Thesis: Synthesis, Structure, and Reactivity of Polyoxovanadates in Nonaqueous Media (1990)
- Doctoral advisor: Walter G. Klemperer
- Other academic advisors: Richard H. Holm (postdoc)
- Website: Official website

Omar Mwannes Yaghi (Arabic: عمر مُؤنس ياغي; born February 9, 1965) is a chemist (Note: Yaghi was born into a Palestinian refugee family in Amman, Jordan. When he was 15, he moved to the United States and he received Saudi citizenship in 2021. He holds Jordanian, United States, and Saudi Arabian citizenships.) best known for developing metal–organic frameworks (MOFs) and pioneering reticular chemistry. He was awarded the 2025 Nobel Prize in Chemistry, shared with Richard Robson and Susumu Kitagawa, for this work.

From 2012 to 2026, Yaghi was a University Professor and James and Neeltje Tretter Endowed Chair in Chemistry at the University of California, Berkeley. In July 2026, he left the university to lead a newly-established artificial intelligence and material science research institute at Tsinghua University. Analysts and media outlets characterized the move as a significant indicator of shifting geopolitical dynamics in scientific research, driven by factors such as changing federal funding structures in the United States and expanded institutional recruitment initiatives by China.

Yaghi is also an affiliate scientist at Lawrence Berkeley National Laboratory, founding director of the Berkeley Global Science Institute, and a member of the U.S. National Academy of Sciences and the German National Academy of Sciences Leopoldina. In January 2025, he became the seventh president of the World Cultural Council, an international organization promoting cultural and scientific advancement.

== Early life and education ==
Omar Mwannes Yaghi was born in Amman, Jordan, on February 9, 1965, to a Palestinian refugee family that had fled from Masmiya, a city located between Jaffa and Jerusalem, during the 1948 Arab-Israeli War. He grew up in a crowded household with many children, all living in a single room that also housed the family's livestock. The family had limited access to clean water.

At the age of 15, encouraged by his father, he moved to the United States. Although he knew little English, he began classes at Hudson Valley Community College. He graduated in 1983 with an Associate of Science in Mathematics and Science. He then transferred to the State University of New York at Albany, where he completed his Chemistry Bachelor of Science degree in 1985. He pursued his graduate studies at the University of Illinois at Urbana–Champaign, earning his PhD in 1990 under the guidance of Walter G. Klemperer. He then served as a National Science Foundation postdoctoral fellow at Harvard University (1990–1992) under Richard H. Holm. In July 2026 he moved to Tsinghua University, China, as full time Chair Professor. He had been an Honorary Professor there since 2022 and a Foreign Member of the Chinese Academy of Sciences since 2025.

In 2021, Yaghi was granted Saudi citizenship by royal decree.

== Academic career ==
Yaghi began his academic career as an assistant professor at Arizona State University (1992–1998). He then held the Robert W. Parry Professorship of Chemistry at the University of Michigan (1999–2006), followed by the Christopher S. Foote Professorship of Chemistry and the Irving and Jean Stone Chair in Physical Sciences at the University of California, Los Angeles (2007–2012).

In 2012, he moved to the University of California, Berkeley, where he was the James and Neeltje Tretter Professor of Chemistry. From 2012 to 2013, he served as the director of the Molecular Foundry at the Lawrence Berkeley National Laboratory. He is the Founding Director of the Berkeley Global Science Institute and a co-director of the Kavli Energy NanoSciences Institute, a partnership between UC Berkeley and the Lawrence Berkeley National Laboratory. He also co-directs the California Research Alliance by BASF and the Bakar Institute of Digital Materials for the Planet.

In May 2025, the University of California Board of Regents promoted Yaghi to the rank of University Professor, the system's highest honor reserved for scholars of the highest international distinction.

In July 2026, Yaghi vacated his position at UC Berkeley to launch the Yaghi Science Initiative and to take up a position at Tsinghua University in China, to lead an artificial intelligence laboratory dedicated to accelerating the discovery of new materials.

== Research ==
=== Reticular chemistry ===
Yaghi is the pioneer of reticular chemistry, a field dedicated to assembling molecular building blocks into open, crystalline frameworks using strong bonds.

According to the International Balzan Prize Foundation, Yaghi first proposed using molecular building blocks and strong bonds to form crystalline materials in the early 1990s. At the time, the scientific community considered this idea chemically unfeasible, as such syntheses typically resulted in non-crystalline, amorphous solids. However, in 1995, Yaghi successfully crystallized metal-organic structures in which metal ions are connected by charged organic linkers, such as carboxylates, via strong bonds. This breakthrough led to the development of a new class of materials known as metal–organic frameworks (MOFs), marking the birth of reticular chemistry.

=== Metal-organic frameworks ===
Yaghi's most recognized work is in the design, synthesis, application, and popularization of metal–organic frameworks (MOFs). According to IUPAC, MOFs are a subclass of coordination polymers, a category first reported in 1959. Earlier work included E. A. Tomic's 1965 study on the thermal stability of various coordination polymers and the work of Hoskins and Richard Robson in 1989 on a 3D coordination polymer structure. However, these early coordination polymers were typically frail, disordered structures with poorly defined properties.

In the 1990s, Yaghi made three key breakthroughs that transformed fragile coordination polymers into the architecturally robust, permanently porous MOFs in use today:

1. The crystallization of metal-organic structures using strong bonds between metal ions and charged organic linkers like carboxylates (1995).
2. The introduction of metal-carboxylate clusters as secondary building units (SBUs), which enabled robust frameworks with permanent porosity, later confirmed by gas adsorption isotherms (1998).
3. The realization of ultra-high porosity with MOF-5 (1999).

The strong bonds in MOFs are fundamental to their structural robustness, ultra-high porosity, and longevity in industrial applications.

=== Covalent organic frameworks ===
In 2005, Omar M. Yaghi published the seminal paper on covalent organic frameworks (COFs), reporting the first series of 2D COFs. This work demonstrated the design and synthesis of COFs via condensation reactions of 1,4-benzenediboronic acid (p-C_{6}H_{4}[B(OH)_{2}]_{2}) and 2,3,6,7,10,11-hexahydroxytriphenylene (C_{18}H_{6}(OH)_{6}). Powder X-ray diffraction of the highly crystalline products—with empirical formulas (C_{3}H_{2}BO)_{6}·(C_{9}H_{12})_{1} (COF-1) and C_{9}H_{4}BO_{2} (COF-5)—revealed 2D expanded porous graphitic layers with either staggered (COF-1) or eclipsed (COF-5) structures. These architectures are held together by strong covalent bonds between boron, carbon, and oxygen atoms, creating rigid porous structures with pore sizes ranging from 7 to 27 ångströms. COF-1 and COF-5 exhibit high thermal stability (up to 500–600 °C), permanent porosity, and high surface areas of 711 and 1590 square meters per gram, respectively.

The synthesis of 3D COFs had been hindered by longstanding practical and conceptual challenges until Yaghi's group first achieved it in 2007.

Yaghi also pioneered the design and production of zeolitic imidazolate frameworks (ZIFs). MOFs, COFs, and ZIFs are renowned for their extreme properties, such as very high surface areas (e.g., 5640 m^{2}/g for MOF-177) and very low crystalline densities (e.g., 0.17 g·cm^{−3} for COF-108).

=== Molecular weaving ===
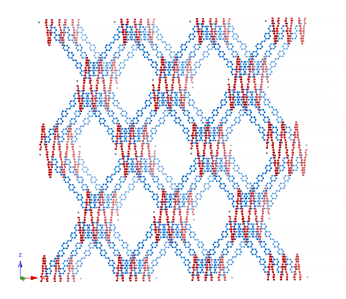
Molecular weaving

Yaghi pioneered the field of molecular weaving, achieving the first synthesis of a material (COF-505) woven at the atomic and molecular levels.

He has led efforts to apply reticular materials in clean energy technologies, including hydrogen and methane storage, carbon dioxide capture, and harvesting water from desert air using low‑grade heat.

According to a Thomson Reuters analysis, Yaghi was the world's second-most-cited chemist between 2000 and 2010.

== Entrepreneurship ==
In 2020, Yaghi founded Atoco, a California-based startup focused on commercializing his advancements in MOF and COF technologies for carbon capture and atmospheric water harvesting.

In 2021, he co-founded a second startup, H2MOF, which applies his discoveries in reticular chemistry to address challenges in hydrogen storage.

== Honors and awards ==
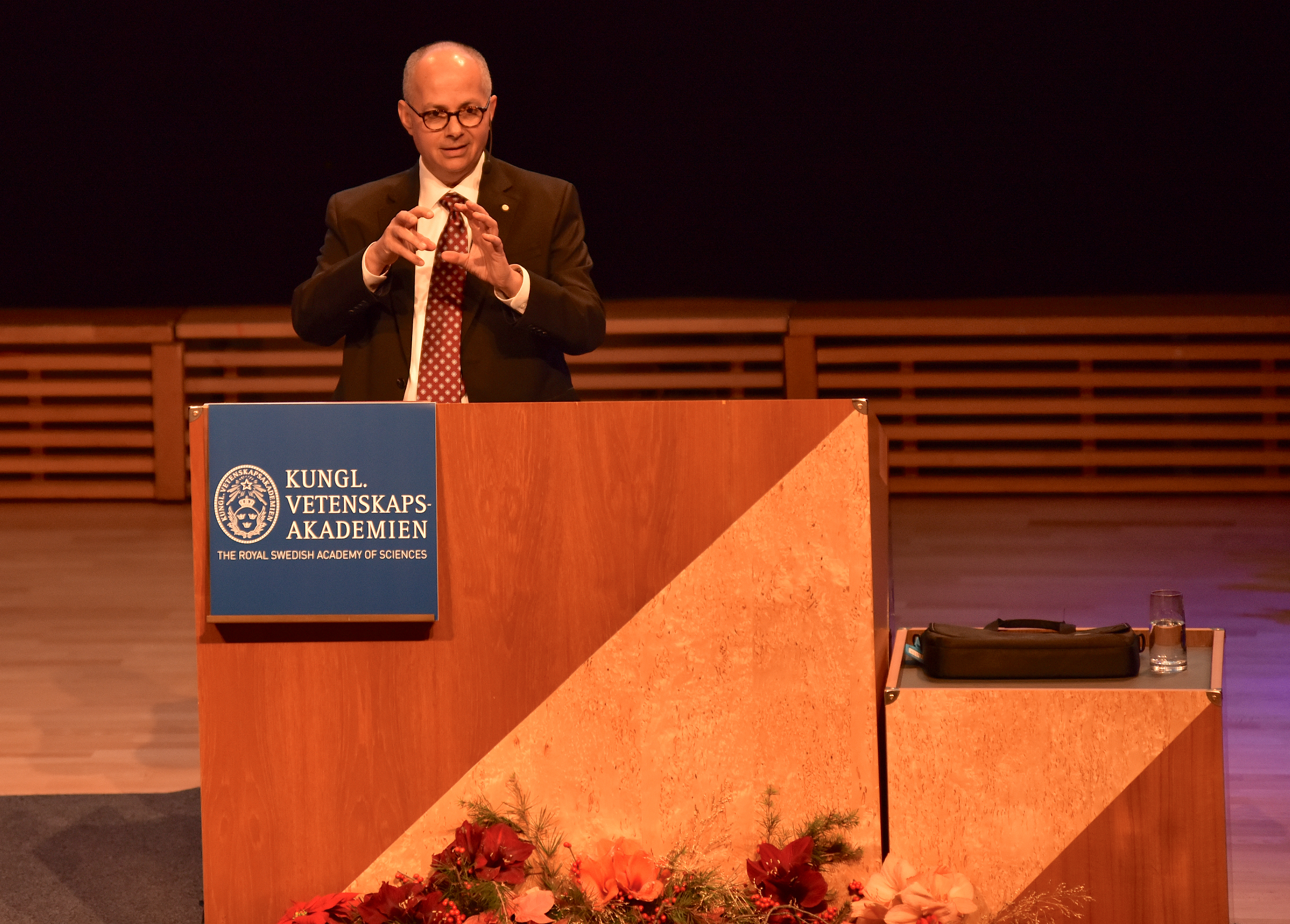
Yaghi in 2025 Nobel lecture

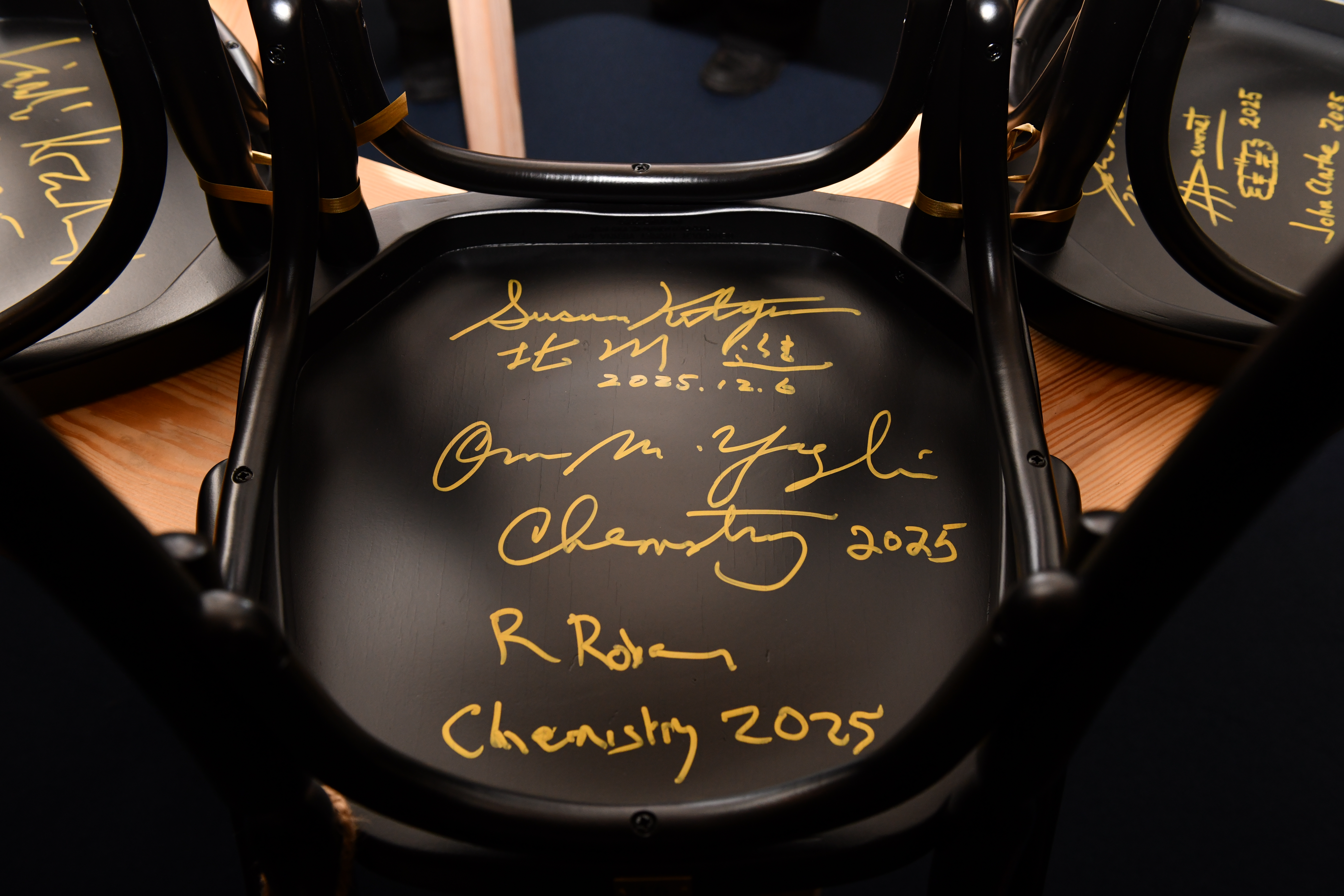
2025 Nobel laureates in chemistry autographed chair

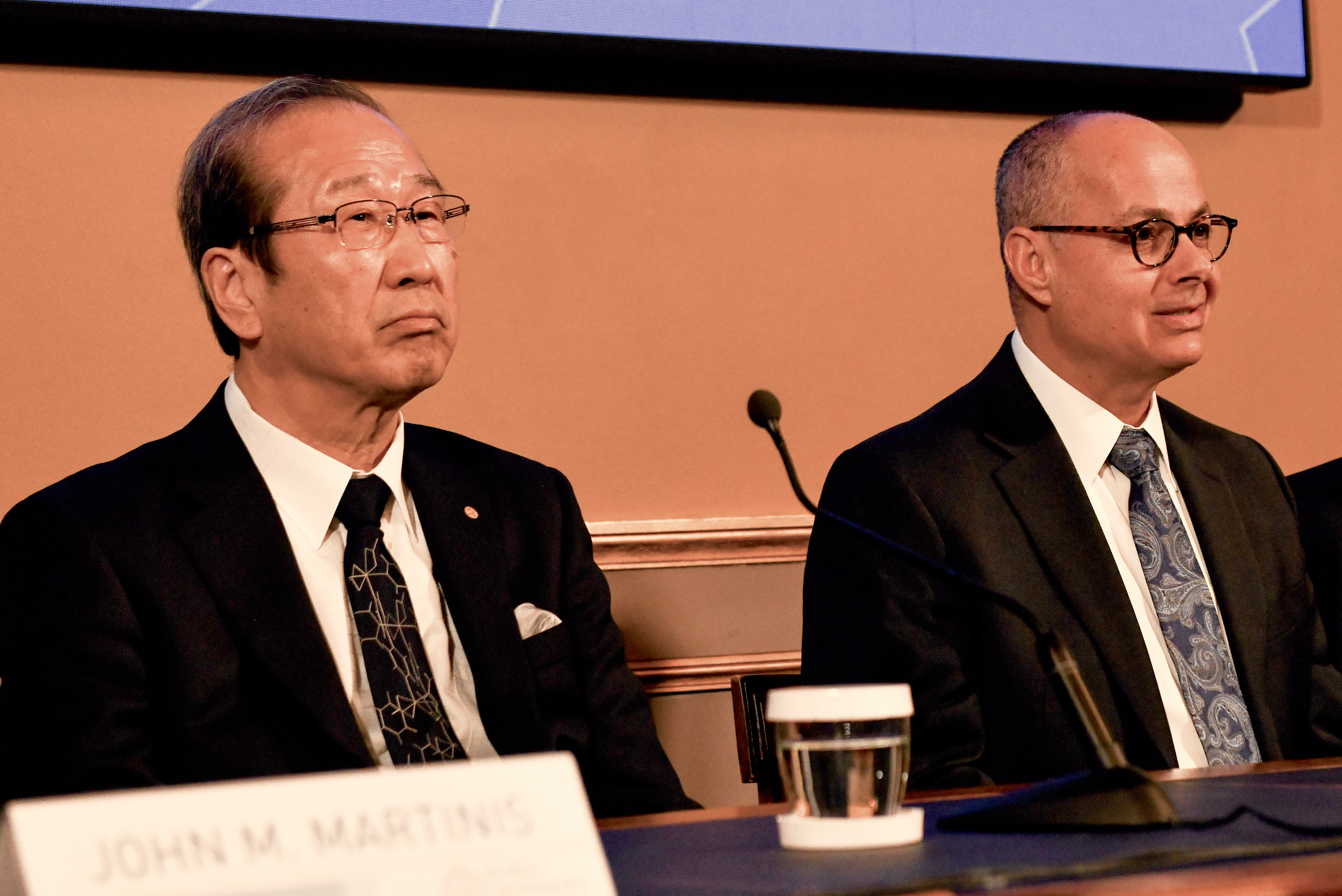
Yaghi with Susumu Kitagawa

Yaghi has received numerous international awards and medals, including the Nobel Prize in Chemistry (2025), the Albert Einstein World Award of Science (2017), the Wolf Prize in Chemistry (2018), the Gregori Aminoff Prize (2019), the VinFuture Prize (2022), and the Science for the Future Ernest Solvay Prize (2024). His key honors include:

- 1998 Solid State Chemistry Award, American Chemical Society and Exxon Co.
- 2004 Sacconi Medal, Italian Chemical Society
- 2007 US Department of Energy Hydrogen Program Award
- 2007 Materials Research Society Medal
- 2007 Newcomb Cleveland Prize, American Association for the Advancement of Science
- 2009 American Chemical Society Chemistry of Materials Award
- 2009 Izatt-Christensen International Award
- 2010 Royal Society of Chemistry Centenary Prize
- 2013 China Nano Award
- 2015 King Faisal International Prize in Chemistry
- 2015 Mustafa Prize in Nanoscience and Nanotechnology
- 2016 TÜBA Academy Prize in Basic and Engineering Sciences
- 2017 Spiers Memorial Award, Royal Society of Chemistry
- 2017 Medal of Excellence of the First Order, King Abdullah II
- 2017 Japan Society of Coordination Chemistry International Award
- 2017 Bailar Medal in Inorganic Chemistry
- 2017 Kuwait Prize in Fundamental Sciences
- 2017 Albert Einstein World Award of Science
- 2018 BBVA Foundation Frontiers of Knowledge Award in Basic Sciences
- 2018 Wolf Prize in Chemistry
- 2018 Recognition by the World Economic Forum as a top 10 emerging technology (for water harvesting from air)
- 2018 Prince Sultan bin Abdulaziz International Prize for Water
- 2018 ENI award
- 2019 Gregori Aminoff Prize
- 2019 MBR Medal for Scientific Excellence, United Arab Emirates
- 2019 Nano Research Award
- 2020 August-Wilhelm-von-Hofmann-Denkmünze, German Chemical Society
- 2020 Royal Society of Chemistry Sustainable Water Award
- 2021 Belgium's International Solvay Chair in Chemistry
- 2021 Ertl Lecture Award, Fritz Haber Institute of the Max Planck Society
- 2022 VinFuture Prize for Outstanding Achievements in Emerging Fields
- 2023 Wilhelm Exner Medal
- 2024 Science for the Future Ernest Solvay Prize
- 2024 Tang Prize in Sustainable Development
- 2024 Ullyot Public Affairs Lecture and Award, Science History Institute
- 2024 Balzan Prize for Nanoporous Materials for Environmental Applications
- 2024 The Great Arab Minds Award
- 2025 IUPAC-Soong Prize for Sustainable Chemistry
- 2025 Honorary Doctor of Science, Princeton University
- 2025 Honorary President, World Cultural Council
- 2025 Von Hippel Award, Materials Research Society
- 2025 Nobel Prize in Chemistry
- 2025 Foreign Member of the Chinese Academy of Sciences

== See also ==
- List of chemists
- List of materials science software
- List of university artificial intelligence research centers
