= ADTA =

ADTA may refer to:

- Abu Dhabi Tourism Authority
- 1,3,5,7-Adamantanetetracarboxylic acid
