= Two-dimensional polymer =

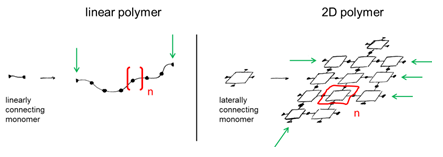
Fig. 1. Structural difference between a linear and a two-dimensional (2D) polymer. In the former, linearly connecting monomers result in a thread-like linear polymer, while in the latter laterally connecting monomers result in a sheet-like 2DP with regularly tessellated repeat units (here of square geometry). The repeat units are marked in red, whereby the number n describes the degree of polymerization. While a linear polymer has two end groups, a 2DP has an infinite number of end groups that are positioned all along the sheet edges (green arrows).

A two-dimensional polymer (2DP) is a sheet-like monomolecular macromolecule consisting of laterally connected repeat units with end groups along all edges. This recent definition of 2DP is based on Hermann Staudinger's polymer concept from the 1920s. According to this, covalent long chain molecules ("Makromoleküle") do exist and are composed of a sequence of linearly connected repeat units and end groups at both termini.

Moving from one dimension to two offers access to surface morphologies such as increased surface area, porous membranes, and possibly in-plane pi orbital-conjugation for enhanced electronic properties. They are distinct from other families of polymers because 2D polymers can be isolated as multilayer crystals or as individual sheets.

The term 2D polymer has also been used more broadly to include linear polymerizations performed at interfaces, layered non-covalent assemblies, or to irregularly cross-linked polymers confined to surfaces or layered films. 2D polymers can be organized based on these methods of linking (monomer interaction): covalently linked monomers, coordination polymers and supramolecular polymers. 2D polymers containing pores are also known as porous polymers.

Topologically, 2DPs may thus be understood as structures made up from regularly tessellated regular polygons (the repeat units). Figure 1 displays the key features of a linear and a 2DP according to this definition. For usage of the term "2D polymer" in a wider sense, see "History".

== History ==
In 1920, Staudinger proposed the concept of a polymer, creating the foundation on which two-dimensional polymer (2DP) research was rooted in. The first attempts to synthesize 2DPs date back to the 1930s when Geoffery Gee reported interfacial polymerizations at the air/water interface in which a monolayer of an unsaturated fatty acid derivative was laterally polymerized to give a 2D cross-linked material. Development of these polymers was given the name of “two-dimensional polymer” in 1941 by Talmud and his coworkers. Synthesis attempts continued, with Blumstein proposing that “sheet-like” macromolecules could be synthesized in 1958. Throughout the next few decades, little progress was made in terms of obtaining structures and performing significant analysis on 2DPs, despite a growing interest in research. In 2004, the discovery of graphene heightened the excitement and research about 2DPs. Additionally, in 2005, Yaghi prepared and utilized two-dimensional covalent organic frameworks (COFs).

== Synthesis ==
Since the mid-20th century, a number of important attempts have been reported in terms of cross-linking polymerization of monomers confined to layered templates or various interfaces. These approaches provide easy access to sheet-like polymers. However, the sheets' internal network structures are intrinsically irregular and the term "repeat unit" is not applicable. In organic chemistry, creation of 2D periodic network structures has been a dream for decades. Another noteworthy approach is "on-surface polymerization" whereby 2DPs with lateral dimensions not exceeding some tens of nanometers were reported. Laminar crystals are readily available, each layer of which can ideally be regarded as latent 2DP. There have been a number of attempts to isolate the individual layers by exfoliation techniques.

In recent development, synthesis attempts have made incredible strides. There are now two general approaches to two-dimensional polymer synthesis: top-down synthesis and bottom-up synthesis (Fig. 2.). Each respective technique has a variety of methods, each with their own advantages and disadvantages.

=== Top-down synthesis ===
Top-down synthesis of 2DPs involves the separation of layers of three-dimensional polymers into two-dimensional components. This approach usually entails breaking weaker intramolecular forces between layers that form three-dimensional polymers, leaving the covalent bonds within any given layer in the planar, two-dimensional polymer.

There are a variety of ways in which this process can be executed, including mechanical exfoliation (also referred to as mechanical milling), liquid phase exfoliation, self-exfoliation, and the crystal method. Mechanical exfoliation involves physically grinding and breaking up the three-dimensional structure of the polymer to leave only two-dimensional sheets; this is a relatively simple and environmentally-friendly procedure. Liquid phase exfoliation involves a liquid-phase sample that is struck with ultrasonic waves; this is a low-cost procedure that separates these layers with high efficiency. Self-exfoliation utilizes charge-induction and acid-base intercalation reactions to separate components. Finally, the crystal method applies a heat or light induction onto a crystal then follows up with mechanical exfoliation.

Fig. 2. Schematic synthesis of graphene (COF) in both bottom-up and top-down 2DP synthesis approaches visualizes the difference in the two-main synthetic methods. Bottom-up synthesis (A) takes individual carbon molecules, nucleates them to form monomer units, and then polymerizes these units to form a sheet of graphene. Top-down synthesis (B) takes graphite and breaks it down into distinct sheets of graphene (each sheet represented by a different color) and they are separated into individual 2D graphene polymers.

=== Bottom-up synthesis ===
Bottom-up synthesis of 2DPs involves the building up of layers from monomers until they have two-dimensional properties. This approach typically involves the formation of covalent bonds that sustain the two-dimensional structure.

Similarly to top-down synthesis, bottom-up synthesis can be carried out in a variety of ways, including interface polymerization, solution polymerization, and a variety of other synthesis methods. Interface polymerization is the most common bottom-up technique and relies on interface interactions, then utilizes light radiation to covalently polymerize monomers. Solution polymerization does not require interface interactions, but rather polymerizes free standing components into a two-dimensional polymer suspended in solution.

== Covalently-linked polymers ==
2DPs include the individual layers or sheets of graphite (called graphenes), MoS_{2}, (BN)x and layered covalent organic frameworks. As required by the above definition, these sheets have a periodic internal structure. Graphene has a honeycomb lattice of carbon atoms that exhibit semiconducting properties. A potential repeat unit of graphene is a sp2-hybridized carbon atom. Individual sheets can in principle be obtained by exfoliation procedures, though in reality this is a non-trivial enterprise. Molybdenum disulfide can be produced as a sheet-like structure by exfoliation. Such sheets represent two-dimensional polymers.

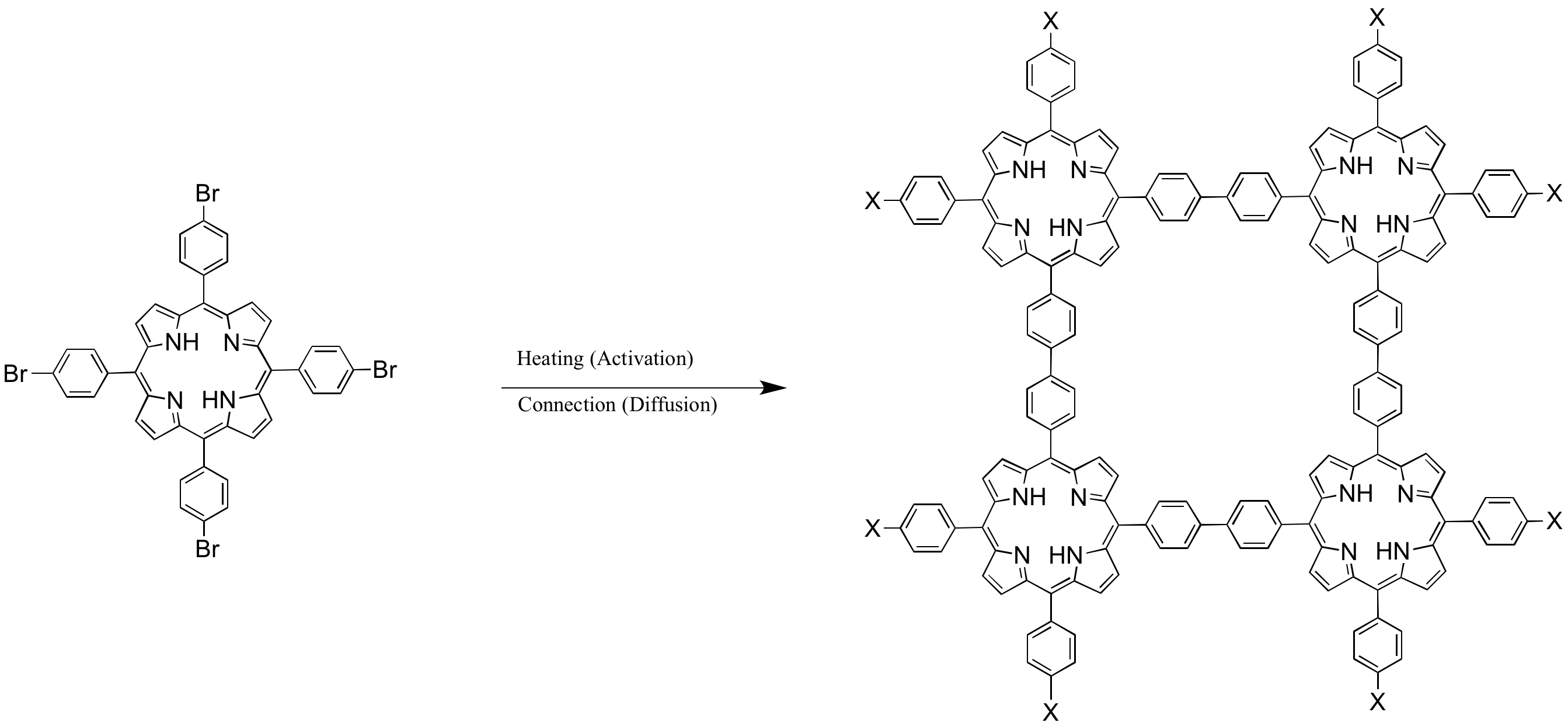
Fig. 3. Surface-mediated 2D polymerization scheme of the tetrafunctional porphyrin monomer.

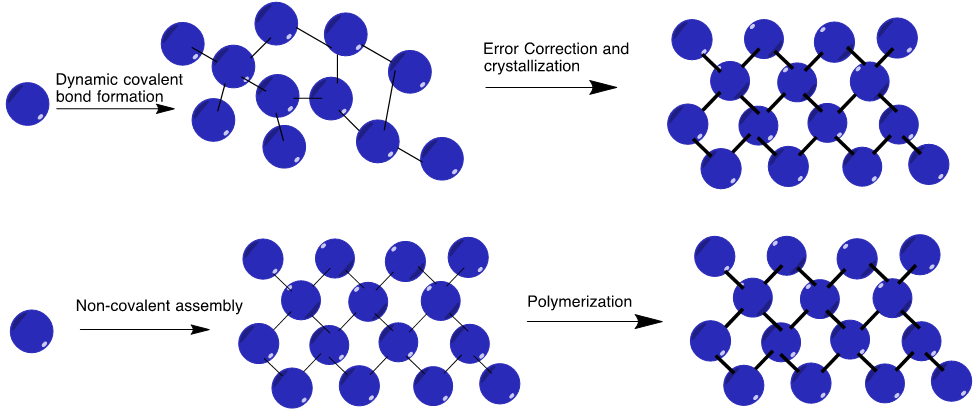
Fig. 4. 2D polymerization under thermodynamic control (top) versus kinetic control (bottom). Solid black lines represent covalent bond formation.

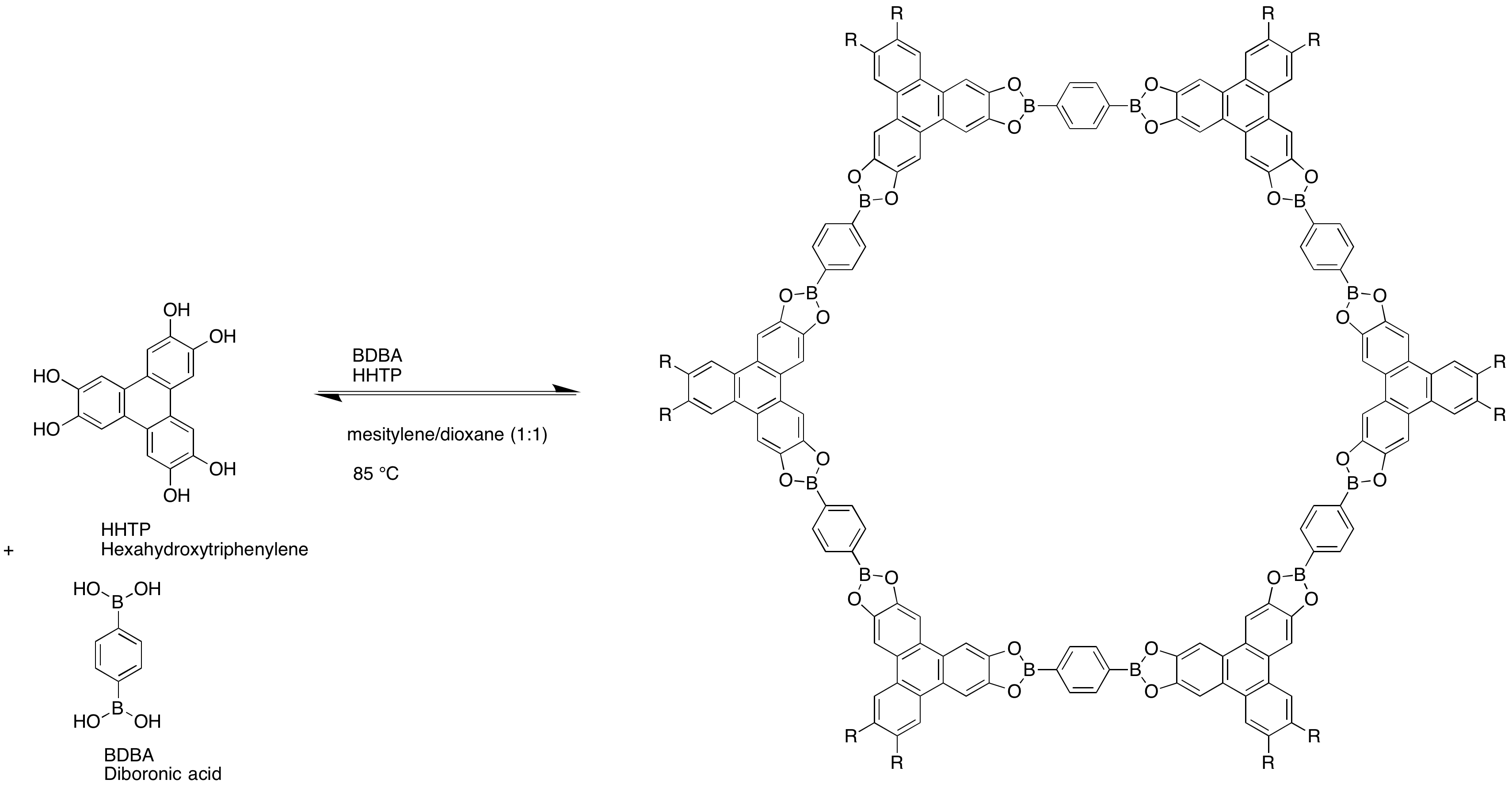
Fig. 5. Synthetic scheme of covalent organic framework using boronic acid and hexahydroxytriphenylene.

Porphyrins are an additional class of conjugated, heterocyclic macrocycles. Control of monomer assembly through covalent assembly has also been demonstrated using covalent interactions with porphyrins. Upon thermal activation of porphyrin building blocks, covalent bonds form to create a conductive polymer, a versatile route for bottom-up construction of electronic circuits has been demonstrated.

=== COFs ===
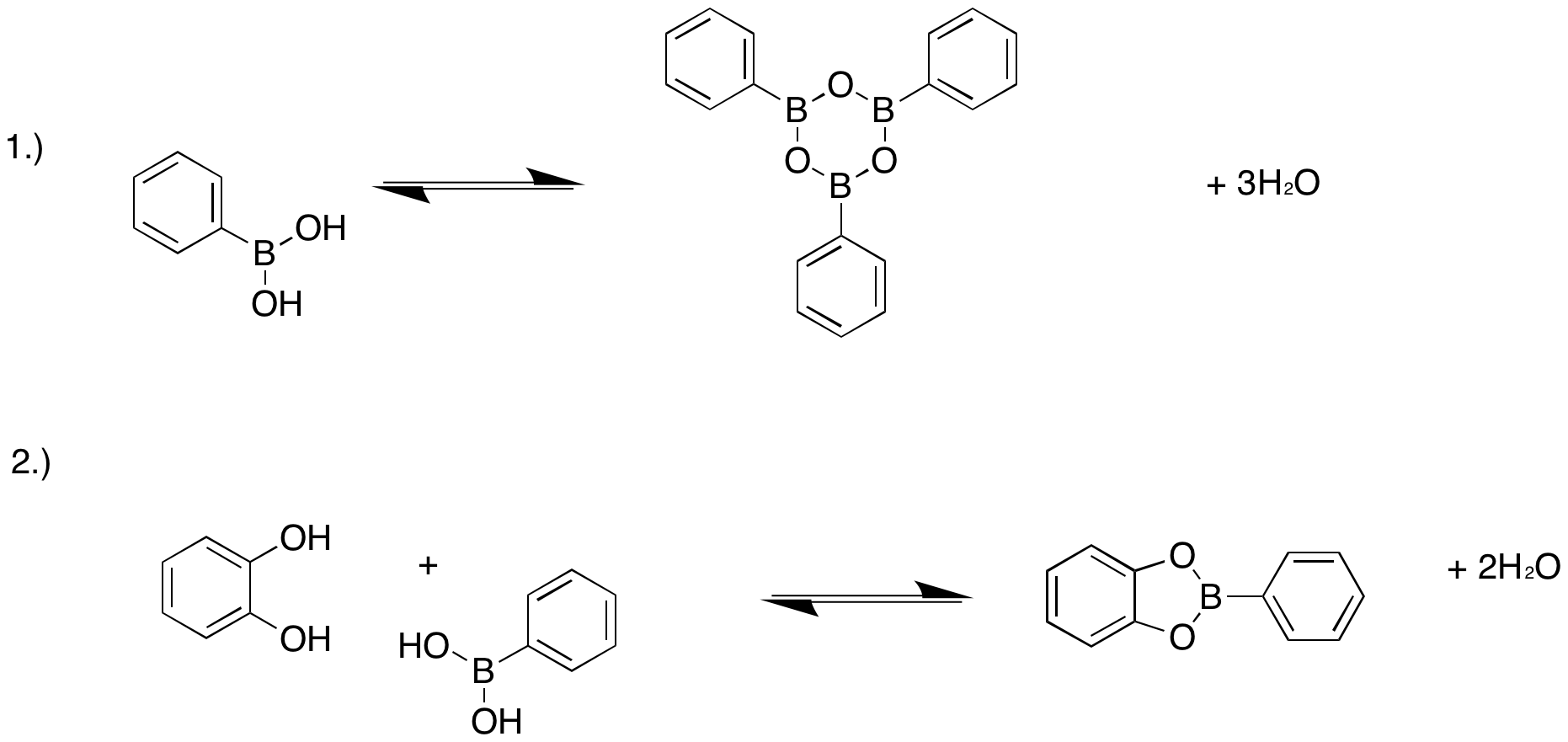
Fig. 6. Boronate ester equilibria used to prepare various 2D COFs

Two dimensional covalent organic frameworks (COFs) are one type of microporous coordination polymer that can be fabricated as a 2DP. The dimensionality and topology of the 2D COFs result from both the shape of the monomers and the relative and dimensional orientations of their reactive groups. These materials contain desirable properties in fields of materials chemistry including thermal stability, tunable porosity, high specific surface area, and the low density of organic material. By careful selection of organic building units, long range π-orbital overlap parallel to the stacking direction of certain organic frameworks can be achieved.

It is possible to synthesize COFs using both dynamic covalent and non-covalent chemistry. The kinetic approach involves a stepwise process of polymerizing pre-assembled 2D-monomer while thermodynamic control exploits reversible covalent chemistry to allow simultaneous monomer assembly and polymerization (Fig. 4.). Under thermodynamic control, bond formation and crystallization also occur simultaneously. Covalent organic frameworks formed by dynamic covalent bond formation involves chemical reactions carried out reversibly under conditions of equilibrium control. Because the formation of COFs in dynamic covalent formation occurs under thermodynamic control, product distributions depend only on the relative stabilities of the final products. Covalent assembly to form 2D COFs has been previously done using boronate esters from catechol acetonides in the presence of a lewis acid (BF_{3}*OEt_{2}) (Fig. 6.).

2D polymerization under kinetic control relies on non-covalent interactions and monomer assembly prior to bond formation. The monomers can be held together in a pre-organized position by non-covalent interactions, such as hydrogen bonding or Van der Waals.

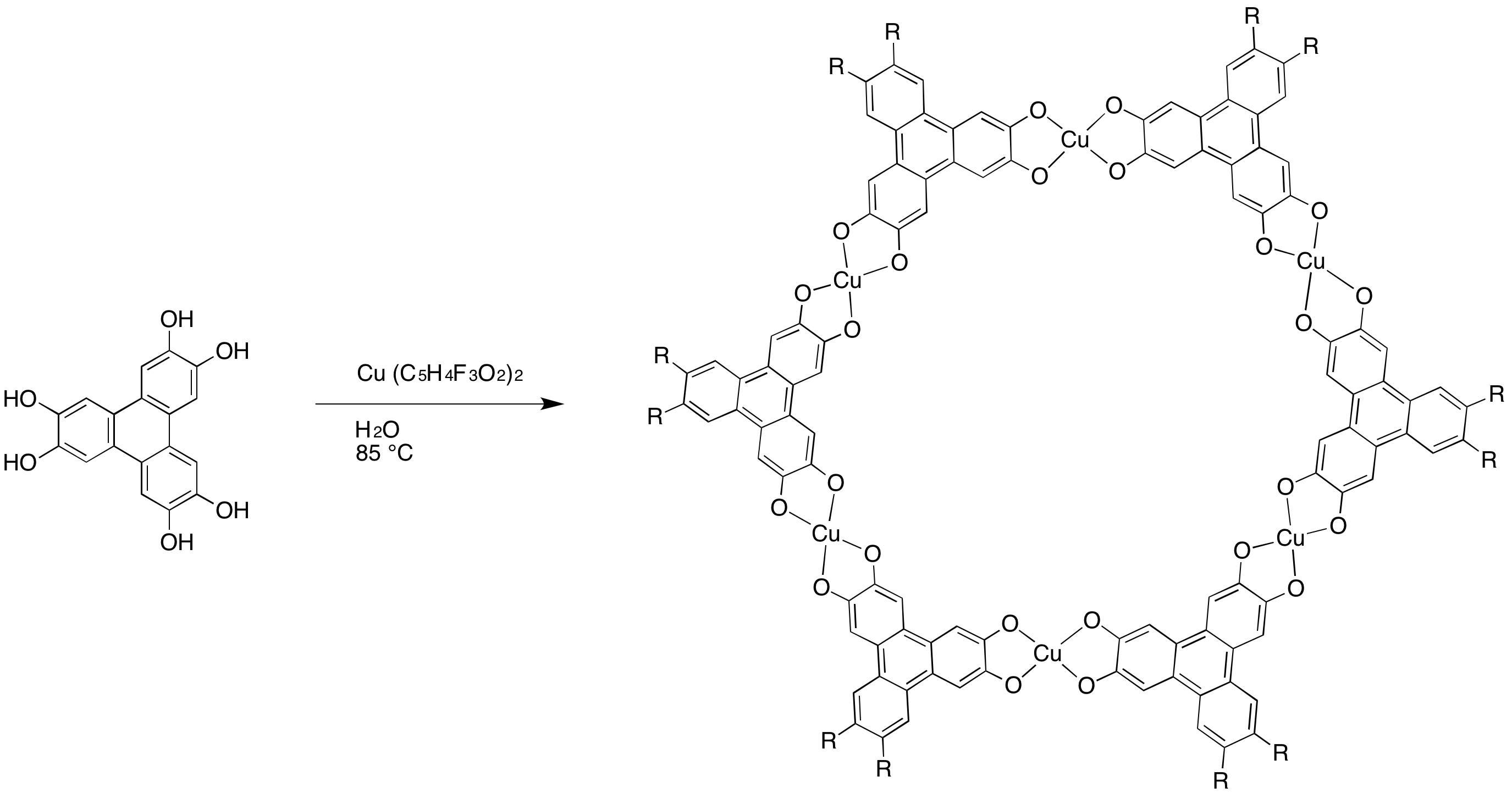
Fig. 7. Synthetic scheme for metal organic framework (MOF) using hexahydroxytriphenylene (HHTP) and Cu(II) metal.

== Supramolecular polymers ==
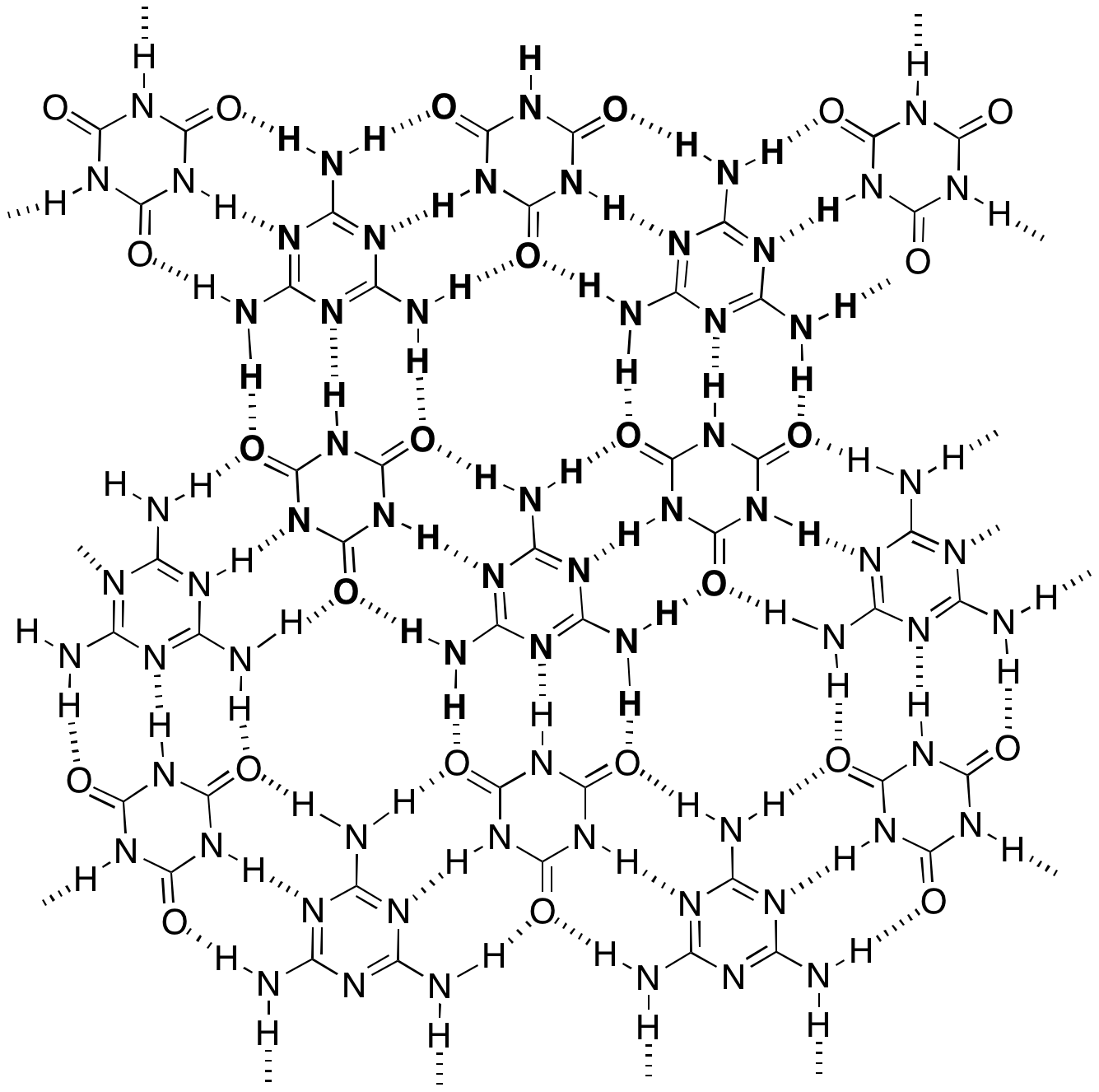
Fig. 8. Supramolecular aggregates of (CA*M) cyanuric acid (CA) and melamine (M).

Supramolecular assembly requires non-covalent interactions directing the formation of 2D polymers by relying on electrostatic interactions such as hydrogen bonding and Van der Waals forces. To design artificial assemblies capable of high selectivity requires correct manipulation of energetic and stereochemical features of non-covalent forces. Some benefits of non-covalent interactions is their reversible nature and response to external factors such as temperature and concentration. The mechanism of non-covalent polymerization in supramolecular chemistry is highly dependent on the interactions during the self-assembly process (Fig. 9.). The degree of polymerization depends highly on temperature and concentration. The mechanisms may be divided into three categories: isodesmic, ring-chain, and cooperative.

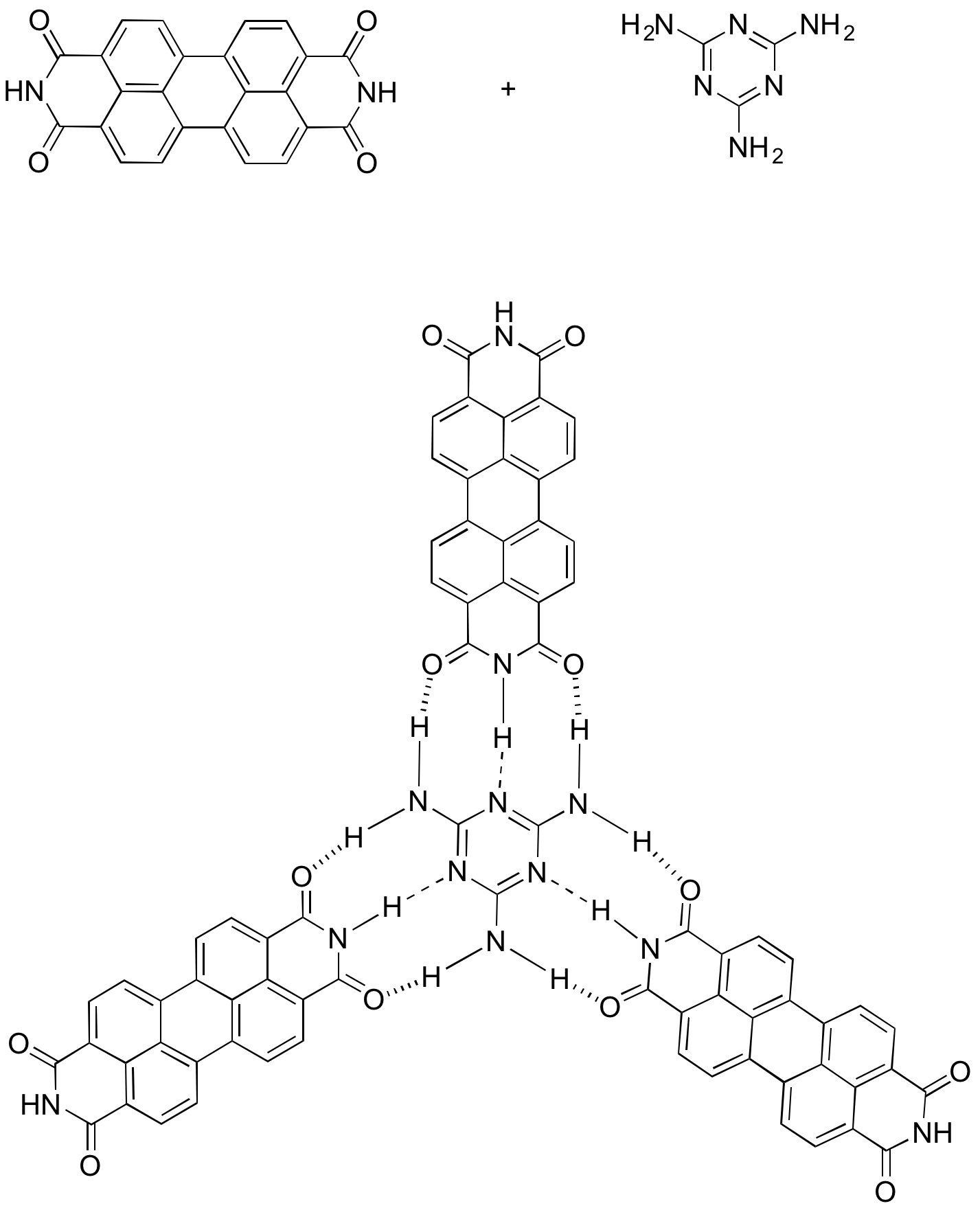
Fig. 9. Self-assembly of a PTCDI–melamine supramolecular network. Dotted lines represent the stabilizing hydrogen bonds between the molecules.

One example of isodesmic associations in supramolecular aggregates is seen in Figure 8, (CA*M) cyanuric acid (CA) and melamine (M) interactions and assembly through hydrogen bonding. Hydrogen bonding has been used to guide assembly of molecules into two-dimensional networks, that can then serve as new surface templates and offer an array of pores of sufficient capacity to accommodate large guest molecules. An example of utilizing surface structures through non-covalent assembly uses adsorbed monolayers to create binding sites for target molecules through hydrogen bonding interactions. Hydrogen bonding is used to guide the assembly of two different molecules into a 2D honeycomb porous network under ultra high vacuum seen in Figure 8. 2D polymers based on DNA have been reported

=== 2D Metal-Organic Frameworks ===
Two-dimensional supramolecular polymers can be composed of coordinately bonded monomers, forming metal-organic frameworks (MOFs). Rather than consisting of covalent bonds found in COFs and most 2DPs, MOFs primarily rely on a metal-coordination bond. MOFs can be formed in 1D, 2D, and 3D nature, but recent research has suggested applications from 2D MOFs specifically. 2D MOFs contain many types of chelating ligands including the following monofunctional ligands, shown in Figure 10: catechol ligands, o-diamine ligands, o-dithiol ligands, and o-diselenol ligands. Bifunctional organic ligands have been coordinated to 2D MOFs as well, for example TABTO shown in Figure 11.

Fig. 10. Four common types of monofunctional ligands for coordinated 2DPs include catechols (e.g. HHTP (A)), o-diamines (e.g. HATP (B)), o-dithiols (e.g. HTTP (C)), and o-diselenols (e.g. TPHS (D)).

These chelating ligands can be modified to change the properties of the MOF. For example, coordination manipulation has resulted in significant electrically conductive and porous properties of 2D MOFs.

== Characterization ==
2DPs as two dimensional sheet macromolecules have a crystal lattice, that is they consist of monomer units that repeat in two dimensions. Therefore, a clear diffraction pattern from their crystal lattice should be observed as a proof of crystallinity. The internal periodicity is supported by electron microscopy imaging, electron diffraction and Raman-spectroscopic analysis.

2DPs should in principle also be obtainable by, e.g., an interfacial approach whereby proving the internal structure, however, is more challenging and has not yet been achieved.

In 2014 a 2DP was reported synthesised from a trifunctional photoreactive anthracene derived monomer, preorganised in a lamellar crystal and photopolymerised in a [4+4]cycloaddition. Another reported 2DP also involved an anthracene-derived monomer

== Applications ==
The recent focus on 2DP research has led to the development of a variety of applications. For example, 2DPs are expected to be superb membrane materials because of their defined pore sizes. Furthermore, they can serve as ultrasensitive pressure sensors, as precisely defined catalyst supports, for surface coatings and patterning, as ultrathin support for cryo-TEM, and many other applications.

Since 2D polymers provide an availability of large surface area and uniformity in sheets, they also found useful applications in areas such as selective gas adsorption and separation. Metal-organic frameworks have become popular recently due to the variability of structures and topology which provide tunable pore structures and electronic properties. There are also ongoing methods for creation of nanocrystals of MOFs and their incorporation into nanodevices. Additionally, metal-organic surfaces have been synthesized with cobalt dithionlene catalysts for efficient hydrogen production through reduction of water as an important strategy for fields of renewable energy. With the fabrication of 2D organic frameworks, researchers have also synthesized two-dimensional, porous covalent-organic frameworks to be used as storage media for hydrogen, methane and carbon dioxide in clean energy applications. While many applications of 2DPs have yet to be utilized commercially, research into the promise of these molecules and their practical applications continues.

Fig. 11. Bifunctional organic ligands have also proved to be incredibly useful in the development of 2D metal organic frameworks (MOFs). Ligands such as TABTO (pictured above) follow the C3-X-Y bifunctional arrangement that is commonly found in these ligands.

=== Potential Applications and Research Development ===
2DPs have a variety of applications and are utilized in a variety of ways. In order to further the utilization of these molecules, 2DPs are being actively researched for potential applications. Some fields of research already utilize 2DPs, such as solar cell research, but further research development can enhance our understanding and capabilities.

==== Solar Cells ====
Currently, the majority of commercially available solar cells utilize 3D polymers and 1D monomers. However, 2026 research has shown promising solar cell applications for 2D polymers as well, specifically in perovskite solar cell development. 2DP-F and 2DP-O are both covalent 2D polymers that are closely related to COFs. These polymers have shown effects that could enhance efficiency in the complicated solar cell mechanism, including bypassing surface defects, preventing lithium cation diffusion of perovskites, and lessening moisture invasion. Research efforts have shown that this mechanism can boost the efficiency of the solar cell by about 24%.

==== Energy Storage and Conservation ====
A variety of 2D polymers have been shown to have promising applications in energy storage through supercapacitors, lithium ion batteries and other battery types as well. Research on supercapacitors has revealed that MOFs have the desired redox properties but cannot withstand the necessary acidic-basic conditions. On the flip side, COFs have been synthesized to incorporate redox-active groups into supercapacitors. COFs have been examined as facilitating supercapacitors, and show promising commercial applications. Additionally, COFs have been shown to be effective in electrocatalysis. Facilitating the CO_{2} reduction reaction, oxygen evolution reaction, and oxygen reduction reaction, COFs have recently shown promising applications in environmental efforts. 2D MOFs have also been the subject of promising research on lithium-ion batteries (LIB) as well as other general types of batteries. These specific MOFs can function as a cathode for LIBs, and one specific 2D MOF (ZBCP) has been utilized to mitigate shuttling effects in the charge barrier of lithium sodium batteries.

==== Sensors ====
The unique properties of 2DPs have made them promising candidates for a variety of sensing technologies. The large surface area to volume ratio of 2DPs allows them to expose many active sites that can be utilized in gas detection. Graphene and MoS_{2}, specifically, have shown promise in chemical sensing, with applications in detection of pH, metal ions, and biomolecules. Similarly, the high surface area combined with the unique atomic-level thinness makes 2DPs candidates for pressure sensing applications. The conjugated pi-systems of these planar molecules provide a mechanism for quick charge transfer, and therefore show promise in the field of electrochemical sensing. This can be extended to biosensing, where research has shown 2DP effectiveness for enzyme-sensing applications specifically.
