= Dmitrii Perepichka =

McGill University chemistry professor and organic electronics researcher

Dmitrii F. Perepichka
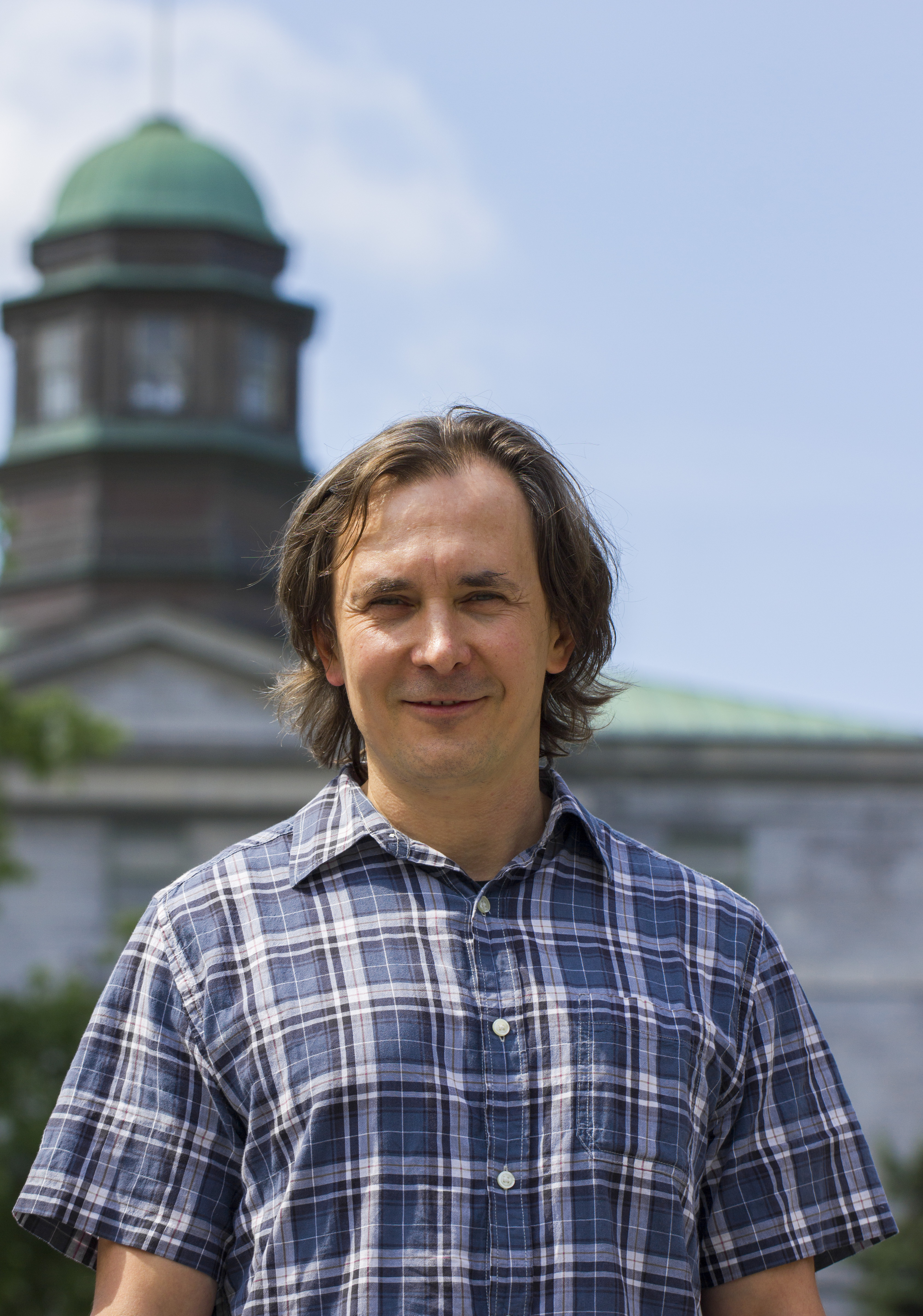
- Education: Donetsk State University, National Academy of Sciences of Ukraine, Durham University, UCLA
- Scientific career
- Fields: Chemistry
- Workplaces: McGill University
- Academic advisors: Anatoliy F. Popov, Martin R. Bryce, Fred Wudl
- Website: http://perepichka-group.mcgill.ca

Dmitrii "Dima" F. Perepichka (born 1972) is the Chair of Chemistry Department and Sir William C. MacDonald Chair Professor in Chemistry at McGill University. His research interest are primarily in the area of organic electronics. He has contributed in the understanding of structural electronics effects of organic conjugated materials at molecular, supramolecular, and macromolecular levels via the study of small molecules, supramolecular (co-)assemblies, polymers, covalent organic frameworks, and on-surface assemblies/polymers.

== Research and publications ==
Prof. Perepichka has authored more than 200 publications on a diverse range of topics such as Conjugated system, Organic semiconductor, Covalent organic framework, Organic room-temperature phosphors, Organic solar cell, Organic persistent radicals, etc. in top-tier chemistry and materials journals such as Nature Materials Nature Chemistry, Journal of the American Chemical Society, Angewandte Chemie International Edition, etc. to name a few. Furthermore, he has published book chapters, as well as having over 100 invited seminars and invited conference presentations.
