= Hydrogen-bonded organic framework =

Hydrogen-bonded organic frameworks (HOFs) are a class of porous polymers formed by hydrogen bonds among molecular monomer units to afford porosity and structural flexibility. There are diverse hydrogen bonding pair choices that could be used in HOFs construction, including identical or nonidentical hydrogen bonding donors and acceptors. For organic groups acting as hydrogen bonding units, species like carboxylic acid, amide, 2,4-diaminotriazine, and imidazole, etc., are commonly used for the formation of hydrogen bonding interaction. Compared with other organic frameworks, like COF and MOF, the binding force of HOFs is relatively weaker, and the activation of HOFs is more difficult than other frameworks, while the reversibility of hydrogen bonds guarantees a high crystallinity of the materials. Though the stability and pore size expansion of HOFs has potential problems, HOFs still show strong potential for applications in different areas.

An important consequence of the natural porous architecture of hydrogen-bonded organic frameworks is to realize the adsorption of guest molecules. This character accelerates the emergence of various applications of different HOFs structures, including gas removal/storage/separation, molecule recognition, proton conduction, and biomedical applications, etc.

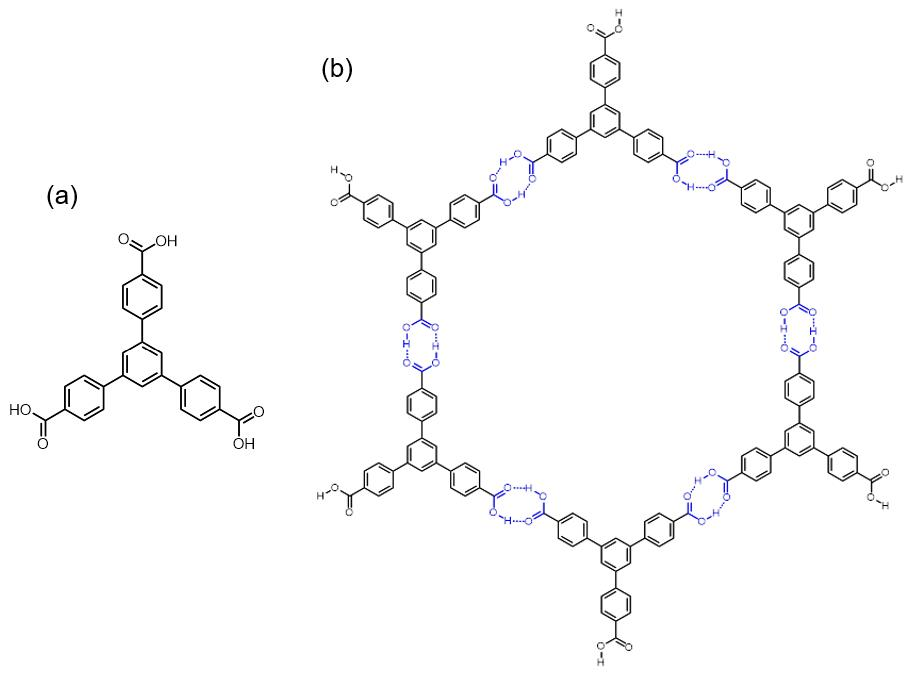
(a) 1,3,5-Tris(4-carboxyphenyl)benzene as a HOF monomer unit. (b) The corresponding HOF structure with porous packing.

== History ==
Reports of extended 2D hydrogen-bonding-based porous frameworks can be traced back to the 1960s. In 1969, Duchamp and Marsh reported a 2D interpenetrated nonporous crystal structure with a honeycomb network constructed by benzene-1,3,5-tricarboxylic acid (trimesic acid or TMA). Then Ermer reported an adamantane-1,3,5,7-tetracarboxylic acid (ADTA) based hydrogen-bonded network with interpenetrated diamond topology. Meanwhile diverse works of guest-induced hydrogen-bonded frameworks were reported successively, which gradually developed the concept of hydrogen-bonded organic frameworks. Another milestone in the evolution of hydrogen-bonded organic frameworks was set by Chen. In 2011, Chen reported a porous organic framework with hydrogen bonding as binding force and demonstrated its porosity by gas adsorption for the first time. Since then, numerous HOF structures have been designed and constructed, meanwhile various applications related to porous frameworks have been attempted and applied to HOFs, whose effectiveness has been proved.

== Hydrogen bonding pairs in HOFs ==
Hydrogen bonds formed among various monomers guarantee the construction of hydrogen-bonded organic frameworks with different assembly architectures. The constitution of the hydrogen pairs is based on the structural and functional design of the HOFs, therefore different hydrogen bonding pairs should be selected following systematic requirements. The hydrogen bonding pairs generally include 2,4-diaminotriazine, carboxylic acid, amide, imide, imidazole, imidazolone and resorcinol, etc. Assorting with appropriate backbones, in every crystallization condition, the hydrogen-bonding pairs will exhibit specific assembly states, which means the morphologies with favored energy for this crystallization condition could be assembled by the monomers. In order to realize 2D or 3D HOFs, monomers with more than one hydrogen bonding pair are generally considered: the rigidity and directionality are also in favor of HOF construction.

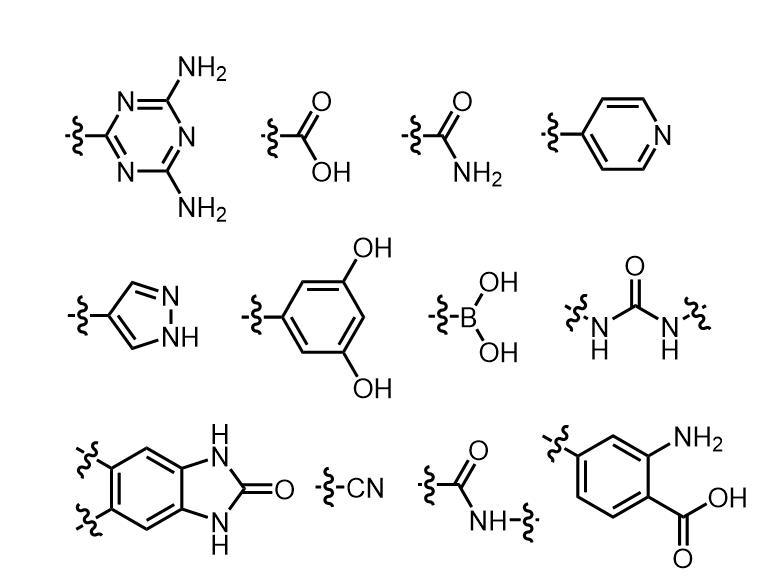
Organic group examples as potential hydrogen bonding units.

== Backbones of HOF monomer ==
Rigidity and directionality of the constructional units offer HOFs various pore structures, topologies, and further applications. Therefore, a proper choice of monomer backbones plays an important role in the construction of HOFs. These backbones not only can combine with different hydrogen bonding pairs mentioned above to realize stable HOF structural design and expand pore size, but also give opportunities to offer more topologies of HOFs. Also, by using backbones with similar geometry and same connection pattern to generate the monomers and HOFs, the isoreticular expansion of the frameworks becomes a reliable method to expand the pore size effectively. As mentioned, for the sake of constructing porous and stable HOFs, multiple aspects should be considered simultaneously, such as the rigidity of the backbones, the orientation and binding strength of the hydrogen pairs, and other intermolecular interactions for orderly stacking. Therefore, the design of HOF monomers should focus on their H-bonds orientations and structural rigidity, and consequent framework stability and porosity.

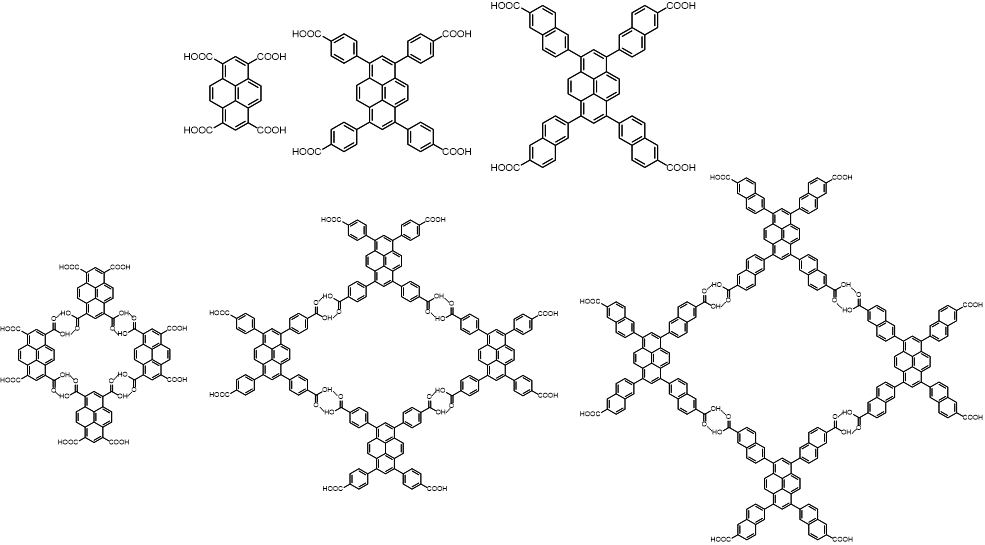
A series of isoreticular expansion carboxylic acid based monomers (a-c) and HOFs (d-f).

== Synthetic methods ==
In principle, HOFs could be crystallized from solvents. However, the factors of solvent types, precursor concentration, crystallization time and temperature, etc., can have significant influence on HOFs crystallization process. Generally, the crystal products can correspond to kinetics through high concentration and short crystallization time, while slowing down the crystallization rate might yield thermodynamic crystals. One common method to produce HOF crystal is to slowly evaporate the solvent of the solution, which benefits the stacking of the monomers. Another widely used method is to diffuse low boiling point poor solvents into monomer solution with higher boiling point good solvents, in order to induce the assembly of the monomers. Depending on different crystallization systems, other methods have also been applied to HOF construction.

== Characterization methods ==
There are various methods to characterize HOF materials and their monomers. Nuclear magnetic resonance (NMR) spectroscopy and high-resolution mass spectrometry (HR-MS) are generally used for characterizing the synthesis of monomers. Single crystal X-ray diffraction (SCXRD) is the powerful tool for determining the structure of the HOF crystal packing. Powder X-ray diffraction (PXRD) is also a supported technique to demonstrate the pure phase formation of HOFs. The gas adsorption and desorption study through Brunauer-Emmett-Teller (BET) method could reasonably demonstrate some key parameters of HOFs, like pore size, specific gas adsorption amount and surface area from the adsorption isotherms. Depending on application directions and study fields, diverse techniques have been applied to the characterization of HOFs.

== Applications ==
The porous structures and unique properties guarantee HOFs good application performance in practical fields. The applications include but are not limited to gas adsorption, hydrocarbon separation, proton conductivity, and molecular recognition, etc.

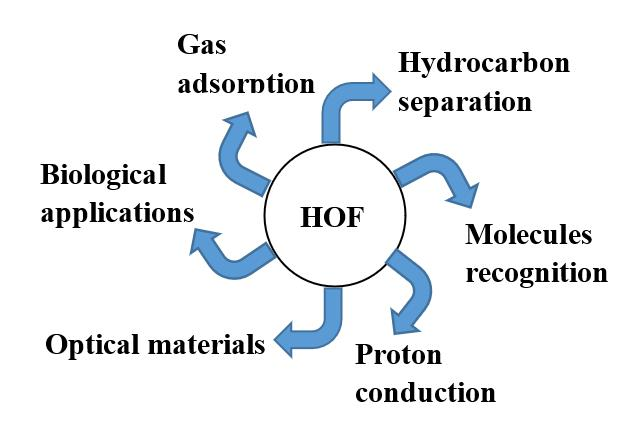
HOF applications

=== Gas adsorption ===
As a kind of networks with tailorable pore size, HOFs could serve as storage containers for gas molecules with certain sizes and interactions. The relatively constrained pore size in HOFs could help to store, capture, or separate different small gas molecules, including H_{2}, N_{2}, CO_{2}, CH_{4}, C_{2}H_{2}, C_{2}H_{4}, C_{2}H_{6} and so on. Mastalerz and Oppel reported a special 3D HOF with triptycene trisbenzimidazolone (TTBI) as constitutional monomers. Because of the molecular rigidity and stereo construction, 1D channels were formed through the frameworks and the surface area was largely enhanced, to the extent of 2796 m^{2}/g as shown by BET. The HOF also presented good adsorption ability of H_{2} and CO_{2}, as 243 and 80.7 cm^{3}/g at 1 bar at 77 and 273 K, separately.

=== CO_{2} adsorption ===
As a typical greenhouse gas that could cause serious problems in many aspects, the capture of carbon dioxide is always under big concern. Meanwhile, carbon dioxide has also been widely used as a gas resource or emitted as waste gas in manufacturing and industry, therefore the storage and separation of CO_{2} have always been emphasized as an important application. Chen and co-workers reported a structural transformation HOF with high CO_{2} adsorption capacity in 2015. The N–H···N hydrogen bond is formed between the units to realize the assembly of the HOF architecture with binodal topology. The CO_{2} uptake capacity of the HOF could reach 117.1 cm^{3}/g at 273 K.

=== Hydrocarbon separation ===
The hydrogen-bonded organic framework used for C_{2}H_{2}/C_{2}H_{4} separation was reported by Chen and coworkers. In the structure of this HOF, each 4,4',4'',4'''-tetra(4,6-diamino-s-triazin-2-yl)tetraphenylmethane unit connected with eight other units by N–H···N hydrogen bonds. Due to certain structural flexibility, the framework was able to uptake C_{2}H_{2} up to 63.2 cm^{3}/g while the adsorption amount of C_{2}H_{4} was 8.3 cm^{3}/g at 273 K, showing effective C_{2}H_{2}/C_{2}H_{4} separation.

=== Molecules recognition ===
The non-covalent interactions existing in the hydrogen-bonded organic frameworks, e.g., hydrogen bonding, π-π interaction and Van der Waals force, are considered as important intermolecular interactions for molecules recognition. Meanwhile, the multiple binding sites and adaptable structures also make HOFs good molecules recognition platform. By exploiting these features, so far different kinds of recognition have been realized, including gas molecules recognition, fullerene recognition, aniline recognition, pyridine recognition, etc.

=== Optical materials ===
Some luminescence molecules with large π conjugation structures are also used for HOFs construction. Therefore, various luminescent HOFs are designed and assembled in order to realize the non-covalent controlled luminescence adjustment which could introduce more functions to the HOF materials. For example, by using tetraphenylethylene (TPE) as backbones, a series of HOFs combined with solvents presenting different color emission have been reported.

=== Proton conduction ===
The hydrogen-bonded organic frameworks constructed with proton carriers have been widely used for proton conduction. The hydrogen bonds can also serve as proton sources in the frameworks to transfer protons. As an example, porphyrin-based structures and guanidinium sulfonate salt monomers have been studied and included in HOF design and construction for proton conduction since the certain conductivity they have.

=== Biology ===
As kinds of metal-free porous materials, hydrogen-bonded organic frameworks are also ideal platform for drug delivery and disease treatment. Meanwhile, with proper monomer selection and reasonable arrangement, Cao reported a robust HOF which could effectively encapsulate a cancer drug Doxorubicin and yield singlet oxygen by embedded photoactive pyrene moiety in order to realize dual functions of drug release and photodynamic therapy for cancer remedy.

=== Computing ===
An HOF-based electronic synapse, TCPP-HOF, used porphyrins to assemble flat, two-dimensional sheets stacked approximately 0.35 nanometers apart. This effected an orderly structure that allows electrical charges to move relatively easily. The sheets mimiced several biological learning mechanisms, including long-term potentiation and depression, where repeated stimulation strengthens or weakens synaptic connections. The devices maintained 10 distinct electrical conductance levels, allowing them to represent different connection strengths. Electrical switching time was 26 nanoseconds.
