= Porous polymer =

Class of porous media materials

Porous polymers are a class of porous media materials in which monomers form 2D and 3D polymers containing angstrom- to nanometer-scale pores formed by the arrangement of the monomers. They may be either crystalline or amorphous. Subclasses include covalent organic frameworks (COFs), hydrogen-bonded organic frameworks (HOFs), metal-organic frameworks (MOFs), and porous organic polymers (POPs). The subfield of chemistry specializing in porous polymers is called reticular chemistry.

== Covalent organic frameworks ==
Covalent organic frameworks are crystalline porous polymers assembled from organic monomers linked through covalent bonds.

== Hydrogen-bonded organic frameworks ==
Hydrogen-bonded organic frameworks are crystalline porous polymers assembled from organic monomers linked through hydrogen bonds.

== Metal-organic frameworks ==
Metal-organic frameworks are crystalline porous polymers assembled from organic monomers connected by coordination to metal atom centers.
