= Conjugated microporous polymer =

Type of porous material

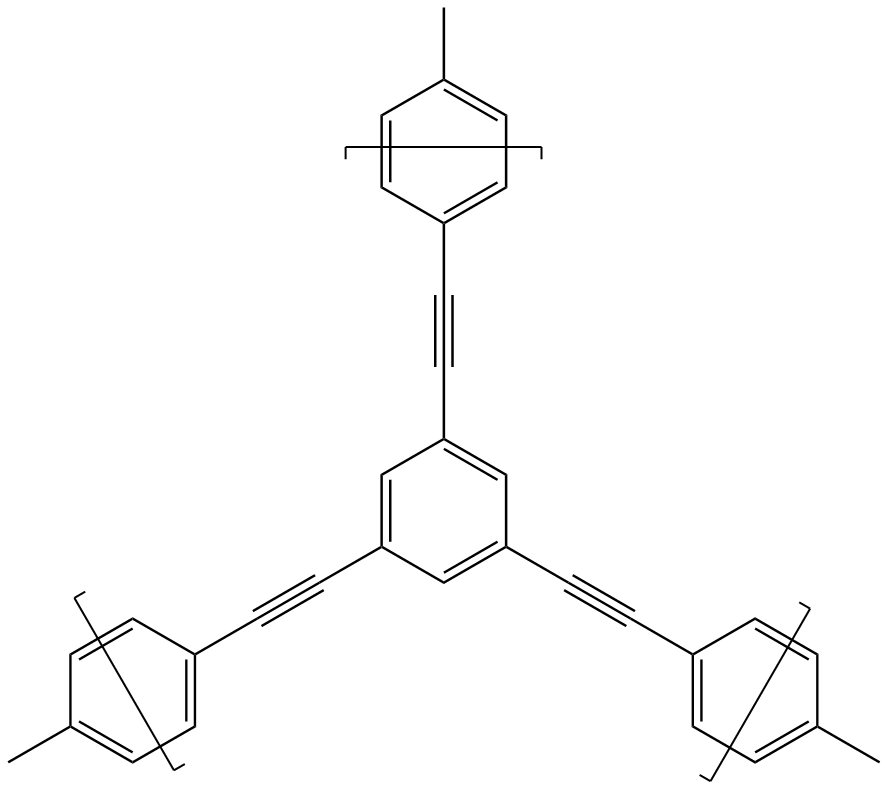
A conjugated microporous polymer showing rigid alkynes and aromatic rings

Conjugated microporous polymers (CMPs) are a sub-class of porous materials that are related to structures such as zeolites, metal-organic frameworks, and covalent organic frameworks, but are amorphous in nature, rather than crystalline. CMPs are also a sub-class of conjugated polymers and possess many of the same properties such as conductivity, mechanical rigidity, and insolubility. CMPs are created through the linking of building blocks in a π-conjugated fashion and possess 3D networks. Conjugation extends through the system of CMPs and lends conductive properties to CMPs. Building blocks of CMPs are attractive in that the blocks possess broad diversity in the π units that can be used and allow for tuning and optimization of the skeleton and subsequently the properties of CMPs. Most building blocks have rigid components such as alkynes that cause the microporosity. CMPs have applications in gas storage, heterogeneous catalysis, light emitting, light harvesting, and electric energy storage.

== Design and synthesis ==
Building blocks that make up the network of CMPs must contain an aromatic system and have at least two reactive groups. To generate the porous structure of CMPs, cross-coupling of building blocks with different geometries to create a 3-D polymer backbone is necessary, while self-condensation reactions occur in the homo-coupling of building blocks with similar geometry. Geometries of building blocks are based on their point group. C_{2}, C_{3}, C_{4}, C_{6} are the geometries seen for building blocks of CMPs.

=== Suzuki coupling ===
Since 1979, Suzuki coupling has been an efficient method for aryl-aryl bond formation. The reaction conditions of Suzuki coupling for the formation of a biphenyl repeat unit for CMPs include the palladium catalyzed cross-coupling of an organo-boron reagent with an organic halide or sulfonate in the presence of some base. An advantage of using this method to synthesize CMPs is that reaction conditions are mild, there is commercial availability of organo-boron reagents, and the reaction has high functional group tolerance. This method is best used for large scale synthesis of CMPs. A drawback to Suzuki coupling is the reaction being oxygen sensitive, often leading to side products, as well as the reaction needing to be degassed.

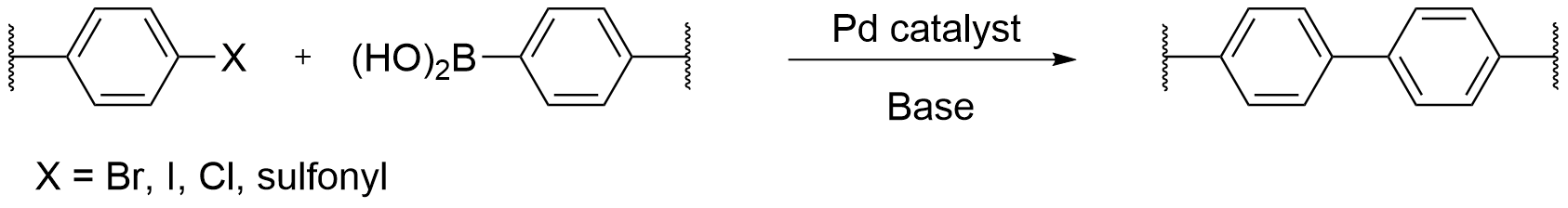

=== Sonogashira coupling ===
Sonogashira cross-coupling of aryl halides and alkynl groups occur with a palladium-copper co-catalyst in the presence of a base. A co-catalyst of palladium-copper is used in the coupling due to the improved reactivity that is achieved. Sonogashira coupling reactions are advantageous in that the reaction has technical simplicity as well as functional group compatibility. CMPs are easily formed using this method due to the ease of rotation of alkynes in planar monomers to achieve a 3-D network. The strength of these planar monomers can be tuned to control the pore diameters of CMPs. Solvents in the Sonogashira coupling reaction can also play a role in the formation of CMPs. Solvents that facilitate the synthesis of CMPs best are dimethylformamide, 1,4-dioxane, and tetrahydrofuran. These solvents help neutralize the formation of the hydrogen halide produced as a byproduct. A disadvantage of using terminal alkynes as a monomer, is that terminal alkynes readily undergo homocoupling under the presence of oxygen, so the reaction must be carried out without the presence of oxygen and water.

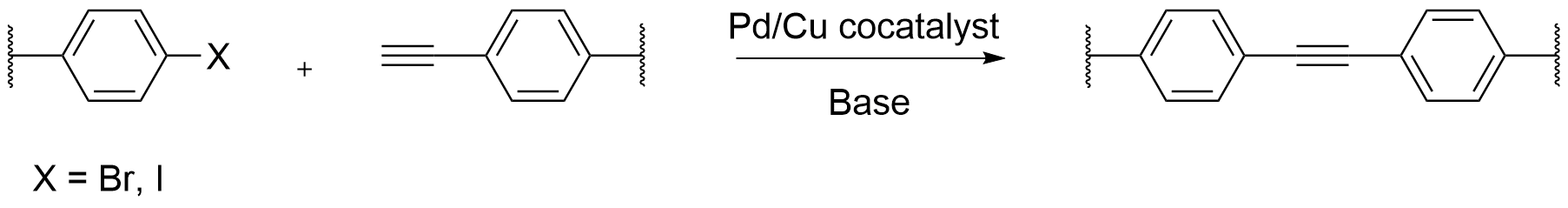

=== Yamamoto coupling ===
In Yamamoto coupling, carbon-carbon bonds of aryl halogenide compounds are formed via mediation from a transition metal catalyst, most commonly bis(cyclooctadiene)nickel(0), often written as Ni(cod)_{2}. An advantage to Yamamoto coupling is only a single halogen functionalized monomer is required, leading to diversity in monomer species, as well as a simple reaction procedure. While most research in CMPs focus on controlling pore size and surface area, the lack of flexibility in the monomers used in Yamamoto couplings give way to free volumes and porosity in CMPs. Only recently have controlled pore size and surface area CMPs via Yamamoto coupling been reported. Ifzan et al also recently reported contra-prepositionally substituted [6]CMP using Yamamoto coupling reaction.

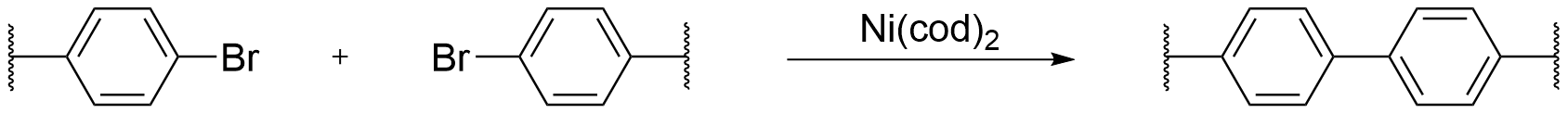

=== Schiff base reaction ===
Most of the approaches currently used to synthesize CMPs must be carried out under anhydrous and oxygen-free environments due to the presence of metal catalysts. Due to the use of metal catalysts, polymers inevitably have trace metals present. Reactions, such as the Schiff base reaction, have garnered much attention in that the reactions are metal free. In Schiff base, amine based monomers and aldehyde containing monomers undergo a reaction to create the repeat unit for CMPs. Schiff base is a preferred metal free method due to industrial scale cheap monomers containing multiple aldehyde functional groups. Another benefit of Schiff base is nitrogen is produced in creating CMPs, which could be beneficial for many applications.

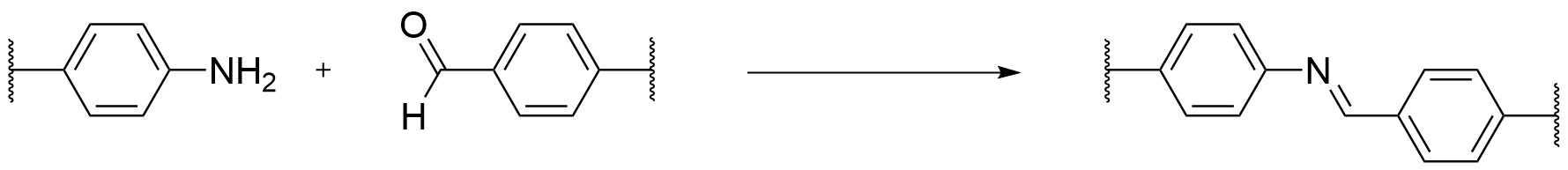

=== Cyano cyclotrimerization ===
Cyano cyclotrimerization reactions occur under ionothermal conditions, where CMPs are obtained in molten zinc chloride at high temperatures. Building units can produce C_{3}N_{3} rings. These rings are then linked to a triangular plane as a secondary building unit. Cyclotrimerization is often used to link tetrahedral monomers to create CMPs. CMPs that are synthesized via cyano cyclotrimerization exhibit narrow micropore size distribution, high enthalpies of H_{2} adsorption and fast selective gas adsorption.

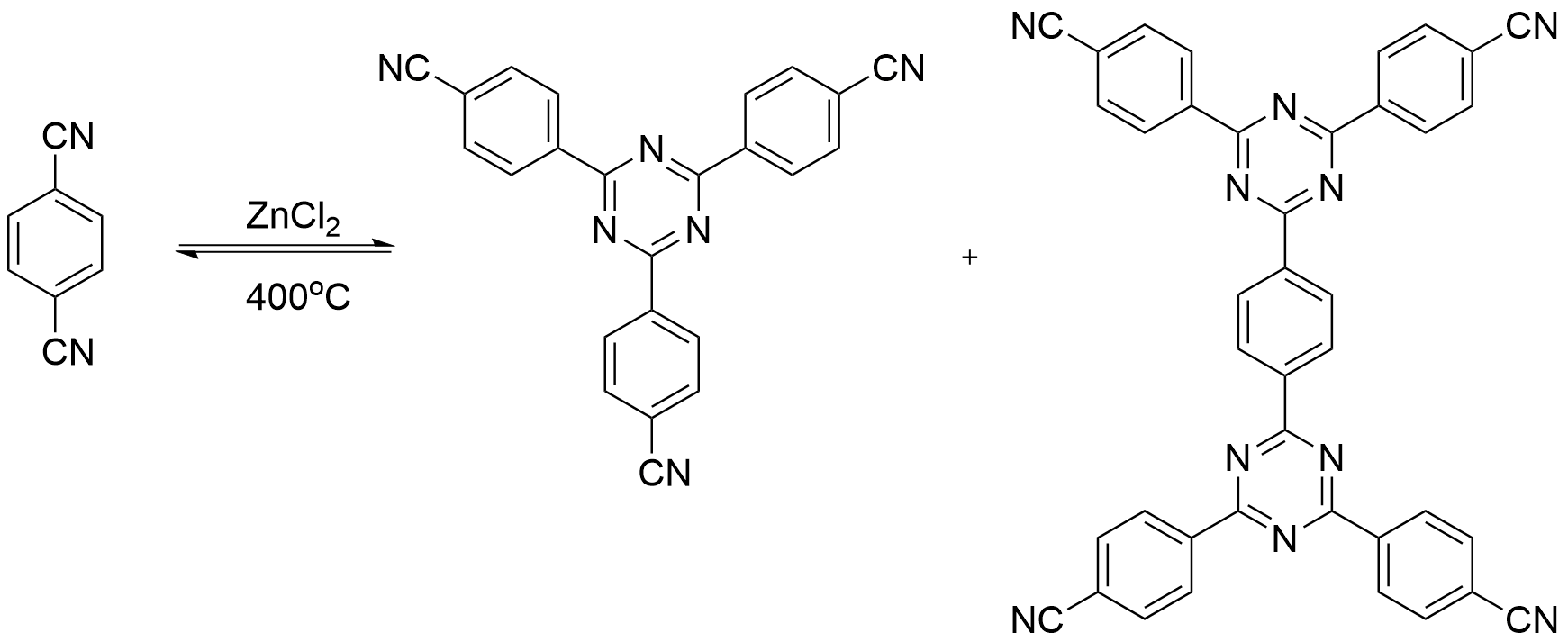

== Properties ==
Several physical properties of CMPs can be attributed to their extended conjugation or microporosity.

=== Electrical properties ===
Much like conductive metals, conjugated polymers exhibit electronic bands. The electrons of the conjugated system occupy the valence band and removal of electrons from this band or addition of electrons to the higher energy conductive band can lead to conductivity. Conjugated materials can in many cases absorb visible light because of their delocalized π-system. These properties have led to applications in organic electronics and organic photonics.

=== Physical properties ===
CMPs exhibit a high level of tunability with respect to surface area and pore size. Monomers can be designed with longer rigid moieties to increase surface area. The series of CMP-1,4 to CMP-5 shows a dramatic increase in surface area from 500 m^{2}/g to 1000 m^{2}/g. The increase in surface area can drastically improve their ability to be filled with various organic and inorganic compounds for different applications. The increased surface area can also improve gas sorption capabilities.

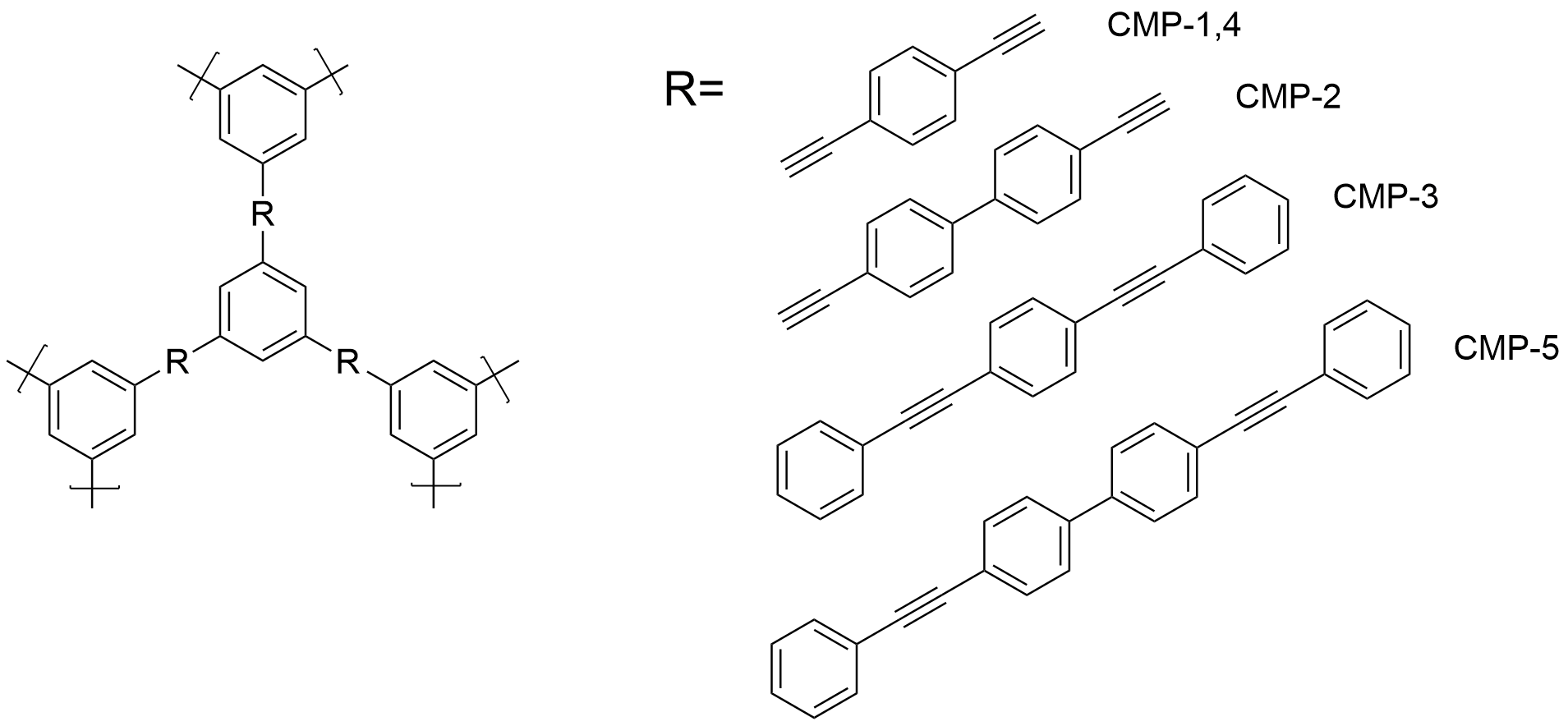
Series of extended linker CMPs

A main drawback of CMPs is their inherent insolubility. This insolubility is caused by the long rigid moieties of the monomers. Several efforts have been made to increase solubility by the addition of solubilizing side-chains but this still remains a barrier to broad applications.

== Applications ==
CMPs have been investigated for several applications since their discovery. Surface areas in CMPs can exceed 1000 m^{2}/g in many cases, although related porous aromatic frameworks, which lack extended conjugation, can have much higher surface areas of more than 5500 m^{2}/g. The porosity of these materials has led to their evaluation as sorbents, particularly for applications in carbon dioxide capture and hydrogen storage. Recent work has focused on their potential in terms of catalysis, for example in the form of 'metal-organic CMPs', and also for light harvesting, and supercapacitors taking advantage of their highly conjugated nature. A further advantage claimed for CMP materials is the ability to derivatize them with a wide range of functional groups.

CMPs have several been applied in several areas that take advantage of both their electronic properties and porous nature. Pores can be filled with inorganic materials, such as TiO_{2}, for applications in photovoltaics. They can be processed to serve as electronic junctions. They allow flow in and out of the pores that can be utilized for surface electrochemical applications.
