= Diphenyldichloromethane =

Names
- Preferred IUPAC name 1,1′-(Dichloromethylene)dibenzene
- Other names Dichlorodiphenylmethane

Identifiers
CAS Number	2051-90-3
3D model (JSmol)	Interactive image
Beilstein Reference	1910601
ChemSpider	15492
ECHA InfoCard	100.016.486
PubChem CID	16327
UNII	81FEZ29AK6
CompTox Dashboard (EPA)	DTXSID9062148
- InChI: InChI=1S/C13H10Cl2/c14-13(15,11-7-3-1-4-8-11)12-9-5-2-6-10-12/h1-10H Key: OPTDDWCXQQYKGU-UHFFFAOYSA-N
- SMILES: c1ccc(cc1)C(c2ccccc2)(Cl)Cl

Properties
Chemical formula	C_{13}H_{10}Cl_{2}
Molar mass	237.12 g·mol^{−1}
Appearance	slightly yellow liquid
Density	1.235 g/cm^{3}
Melting point	146 to 150 °C (295 to 302 °F; 419 to 423 K)
Boiling point	193 °C (379 °F; 466 K) at 32 torr

Hazards
Flash point	110 °C (230 °F; 383 K)
- Except where otherwise noted, data are given for materials in their standard state (at 25 °C [77 °F], 100 kPa). verify (what is ?) Infobox references

Diphenyldichloromethane is an organic compound with the formula (C_{6}H_{5})_{2}CCl_{2}. It is a colorless solid that is used as a precursor to other organic compounds.

== Synthesis ==
It is prepared from carbon tetrachloride and anhydrous aluminium chloride as catalyst in a double Friedel-Crafts alkylation of benzene. Alternatively, benzophenone is treated with phosphorus pentachloride:

(C_{6}H_{5})_{2}CO + PCl_{5} → (C_{6}H_{5})_{2}CCl_{2} + POCl_{3}

== Reactions ==
It undergoes hydrolysis to benzophenone.

(C_{6}H_{5})_{2}CCl_{2} + H_{2}O → (C_{6}H_{5})_{2}CO + 2 HCl

Reductive dehalogenation of diphenyldichloromethane with copper or with nickel gives tetraphenylethylene:

(C_{6}H_{5})_{2}CCl_{2} + 4 Cu → (C_{6}H_{5})_{2}C=C(C_{6}H_{5})_{2} + 4 CuCl
