= Oxoborane =

Chemical compounds containing a –B=O group

In chemistry, an oxoborane is any chemical compound containing a boron atom with a terminal oxygen atom (a −B=O functional group). The compound class is of some relevance to academic research. The parent compound, HBO, itself called "oxoborane", together with derivatives FBO, ClBO, BrBO, HOBO and MeBO have been detected in matrix isolation or in the gaseous phase at high temperature. In these compounds the boron and oxygen form a triple bond prone to cyclotrimerization to boroxines.

== Derivatives ==
Although monomeric oxoboranes have not been isolated, derivatives have been described.

A Lewis acid-stabilized adduct of an oxoborane is (NacNacB=O^{.}AlCl_{3}. In this compound the oxygen atom is coordinated to aluminium chloride. The BO bond length is 130 pm (compare to 136 pm in regular boronic acids). Related systems are known.

In trans-[(Cy_{3}P)_{2}PtBr(BO)], platinum is coordinated to the BO unit. In this compound the BO bond length is 120 picometers.
