= Tetraphenylethylene =

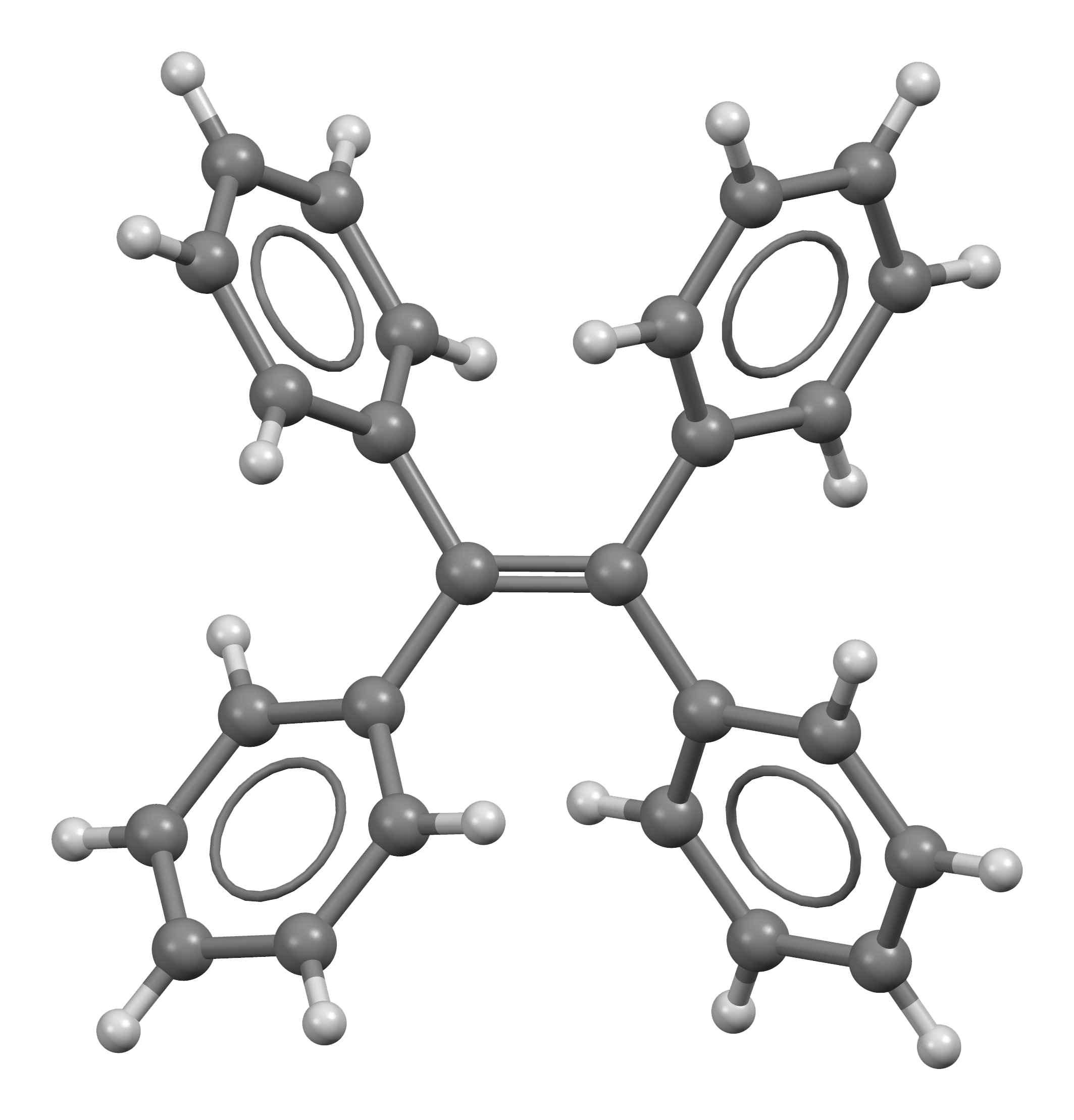

Names
- Preferred IUPAC name 1,1′,1′′,1′′′-Ethenetetrayltetrabenzene
- Other names 1,1,2,2-Tetraphenylethene; Tetraphenylethylene

Identifiers
CAS Number	632-51-9
3D model (JSmol)	Interactive image
Beilstein Reference	789087
ChemSpider	62645
ECHA InfoCard	100.010.164
PubChem CID	69437
UNII	MT243CE29P
CompTox Dashboard (EPA)	DTXSID1060895
- InChI: InChI=1S/C26H20/c1-5-13-21(14-6-1)25(22-15-7-2-8-16-22)26(23-17-9-3-10-18-23)24-19-11-4-12-20-24/h1-20H Key: JLZUZNKTTIRERF-UHFFFAOYSA-N; InChI=1/C26H20/c1-5-13-21(14-6-1)25(22-15-7-2-8-16-22)26(23-17-9-3-10-18-23)24-19-11-4-12-20-24/h1-20H Key: JLZUZNKTTIRERF-UHFFFAOYAF
- SMILES: c1ccc(cc1)C(=C(c2ccccc2)c3ccccc3)c4ccccc4

Properties
Chemical formula	C_{26}H_{20}
Molar mass	332.446 g·mol^{−1}
Appearance	yellow solid
Density	1.088 g/cm^{3}
Melting point	224 to 225 °C (435 to 437 °F; 497 to 498 K)
Boiling point	424 °C (795 °F; 697 K)

Hazards
Flash point	206.2 °C (403.2 °F; 479.3 K)
- Except where otherwise noted, data are given for materials in their standard state (at 25 °C [77 °F], 100 kPa). verify (what is ?) Infobox references

Tetraphenylethene (TPE) is an organic chemical compound with the formula Ph_{2}C=CPh_{2}, where Ph = phenyl (C_{6}H_{5}). Samples have been described as a yellow solid, but the compound is colorless. The molecule is crowded such that all four phenyl groups are twisted out of the plane defined by the center six carbon atoms. Tetraphenylethylene is used as a precursor to other organic compounds, often in the area of supramolecular chemistry.

== Synthesis ==
Tetraphenylethylene can be synthesized from diphenyldichloromethane using copper as a halide acceptor:

2(C_{6}H_{5})_{2}CCl_{2} + 4 Cu → (C_{6}H_{5})_{2}C=C(C_{6}H_{5})_{2} + 4 CuCl

Nickel can be used in place of copper.
