= 1,3,5,7-Adamantanetetracarboxylic acid =

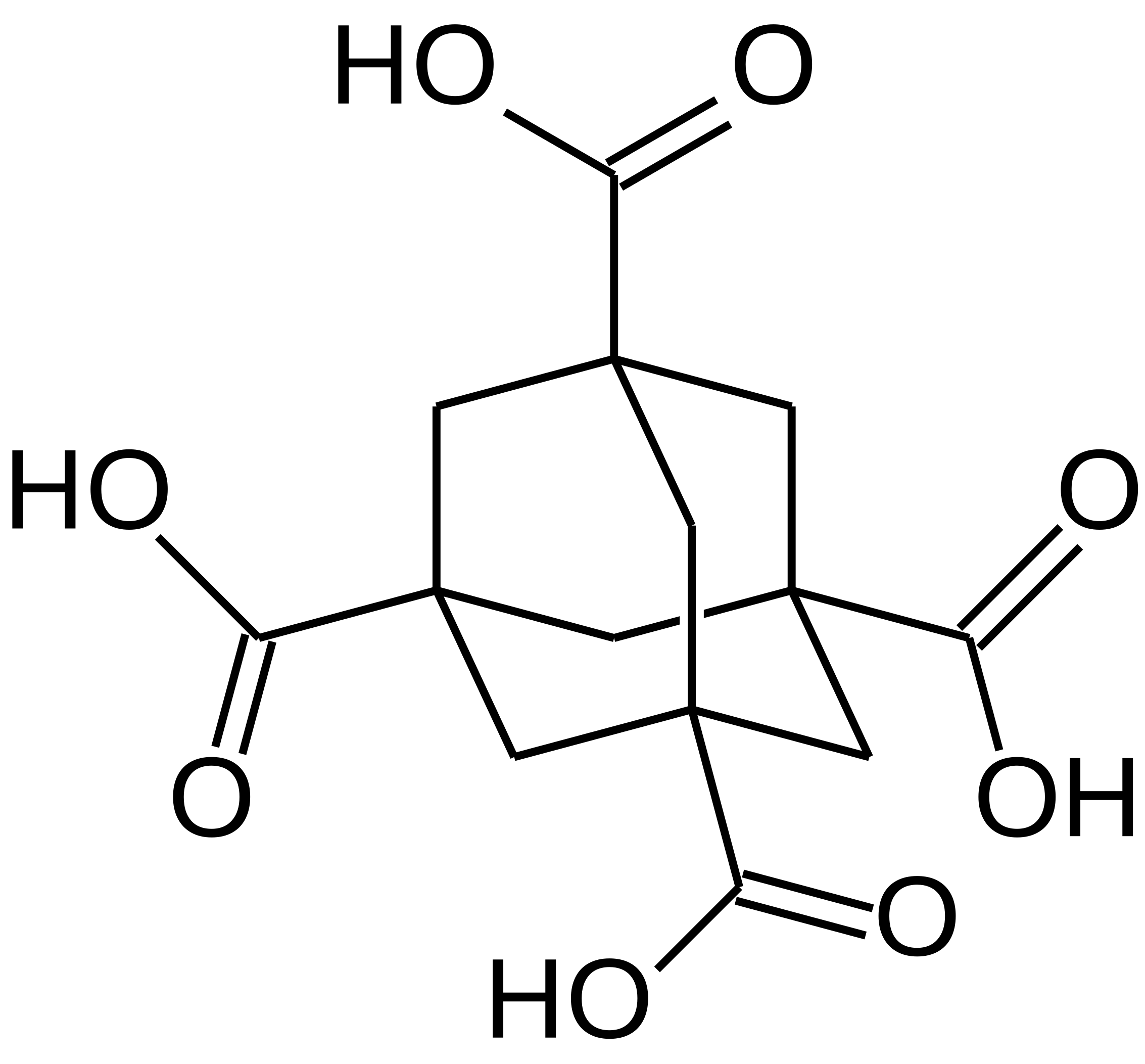

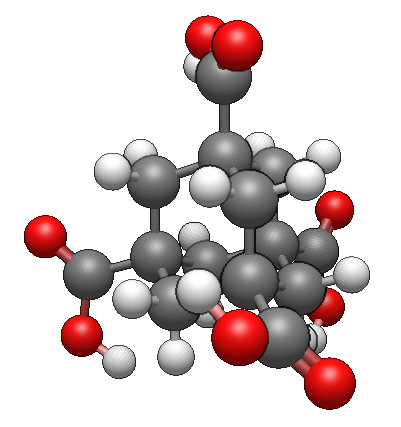

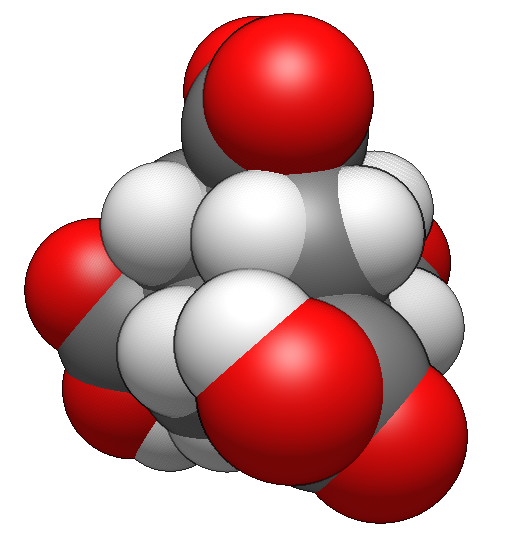

Names
- Preferred IUPAC name Adamantane-1,3,5,7-tetracarboxylic acid
- Other names 1,3,5,7-Adamantanetetracarboxylic acid Tricyclo[3.3.1.1^{3,7}]decane-1,3,5,7-tetracarboxylic acid

Identifiers
CAS Number	100884-80-8
3D model (JSmol)	Interactive image
Abbreviations	ADTA
ChemSpider	540862
PubChem CID	622495
CompTox Dashboard (EPA)	DTXSID80347521
- InChI: InChI=1S/C14H16O8/c15-7(16)11-1-12(8(17)18)4-13(2-11,9(19)20)6-14(3-11,5-12)10(21)22/h1-6H2,(H,15,16)(H,17,18)(H,19,20)(H,21,22) Key: VWAIZPYLEYEEFK-UHFFFAOYSA-N
- SMILES: C1C2(CC3(CC1(CC(C2)(C3)C(=O)O)C(=O)O)C(=O)O)C(=O)O

Properties
Chemical formula	C_{14}H_{16}O_{8}
Molar mass	312.274 g·mol^{−1}
Appearance	colorless crystalline solid
Melting point	395 °C (743 °F; 668 K)

Related compounds
Related compounds	1-Adamantanecarboxylic acid
- Except where otherwise noted, data are given for materials in their standard state (at 25 °C [77 °F], 100 kPa). Infobox references

1,3,5,7-Adamantanetetracarboxylic acid is an adamantane derivative containing four carboxylic acid groups bonded to each of its four tetrahedral carbon centers. Its tetrahedral symmetry provides applications as a hydrogen-bonded organic framework linker and as a dendrimer core.

== Preparation ==
In Ermer's 1988 first application of 1,3,5,7-adamantanetetracarboxylic acid as a monomer for a hydrogen-bonded organic framework, it was prepared by alkaline hydrolysis of 1,3,5,7-adamantanetetracarboxamide.

== Uses ==
1,3,5,7-Adamantanetetracarboxylic acid (abbreviated as the ADTA linker in reticular chemistry) was used in 1988 as one of the first linkers in hydrogen-bonded organic frameworks. A tetrahedral linker, it crystallizes into a five-fold interpenetrated diamond cubic network in which ADTA units are hydrogen-bonded to each other through their carboxylic acid groups.
