= Diselenolene metal complexes =

Metal complex with a central selenium atom

1,2-Diselenolene metal complexes are a class of coordination compounds homologous to 1,2-dithiolene metal complexes and formally deriving from ene-1,2-diselenolato ligands.

1,2-Diselenolene (DSE) is a versatile ligand that forms complexes with various transition metals. The term refers to the metal complexes containing at least one five-membered heterocyclic molecule that contains two adjacent selenium atoms in a planar, anti-aromatic ring system.

One of the earliest examples of DSE metal complexes was reported by Davison and Shawl. Since then, several other transition metals such as palladium, platinum, gold, and nickel have been shown to form complexes with DSE.

The synthesis of DSE metal complexes is typically achieved by the reaction of a DSE proligand with a metal precursor in the presence of a suitable reducing agent. The choice of reducing agent depends on the oxidation state of the metal ion and the desired redox properties of the complex.

The characterization of DSE metal complexes is typically performed by a combination of spectroscopic and electrochemical techniques. Infrared and Raman spectroscopy can be used to identify the vibrational modes of the ligand and the metal-ligand bonds. X-ray crystallography can provide valuable information about the molecular structure and bonding in the complex. Electrochemical techniques such as cyclic voltammetry and differential pulse voltammetry can be used to determine the redox properties of the complexes.

The electronic properties of DSE metal complexes can be tuned by varying the metal center and the substitution pattern on the DSE ligand. For example, the replacement of one or both selenium atoms with sulfur or tellurium can alter the electronic properties of the complex. The substitution of alkyl or aryl groups on the DSE ligand can also affect the redox properties and stability of the complex.

In recent years, there has been growing interest in the use of DSE metal complexes as catalysts for organic transformations. For example, the palladium complex [Pd(DSE)2] has been shown to be an effective catalyst for the Suzuki-Miyaura cross-coupling reaction. The platinum complex [Pt(DSE)2] has been used as a catalyst for the oxidation of alcohols and the reduction of nitroarenes. The unique electronic properties of DSE metal complexes make them promising candidates for catalytic applications in a wide range of organic transformations.

In addition to their potential applications in catalysis, DSE metal complexes also exhibit interesting optoelectronic properties. For example, the palladium complex [Pd(DSE)2] has been shown to exhibit photoluminescence in the solid state. The gold complex [Au(DSE)2] has been used as a building block for the construction of luminescent materials. The unique electronic properties of DSE metal complexes make them promising candidates for applications in optoelectronics and photonics.

== Non-innocence ==
In addition to the unique structural and electronic properties of 1,2-diselenolene metal complexes, their behavior as redox-active ligands has also been a subject of recent investigation. The term "non-innocent" has been used to describe ligands that undergo changes in oxidation state or electronic configuration upon coordination to a metal center, which can dramatically impact the reactivity and properties of the resulting complex.

Several studies have demonstrated the non-innocence of 1,2-diselenolene ligands in their metal complexes. For example, the coordination of a 1,2-diselenolene ligand to a metal center can result in significant changes in the ligand's redox potential. In some cases, the ligand can become reduced upon coordination, leading to the formation of metal-ligand radical species. These radicals can then participate in a variety of redox processes, including the oxidation or reduction of other ligands or substrates.

Non-innocent behavior has also been observed in the reactivity of 1,2-diselenolene metal complexes towards small molecules such as O_{2} and CO_{2}. In some cases, coordination of these molecules to the metal center can induce changes in the electronic structure of the 1,2-diselenolene ligand, leading to the formation of reactive intermediates. These intermediates can then participate in a range of chemical reactions, including the activation of O2 for selective oxidation reactions.

In addition to their redox and reactivity properties, 1,2-diselenolene metal complexes have also been investigated for their potential applications in areas such as catalysis, materials science, and electronics. For example, the unique electronic and optical properties of these complexes have led to their use as building blocks for the development of new organic electronic materials, such as OLEDs and solar cells.

Furthermore, the non-innocence of 1,2-diselenolene ligands has been exploited for the development of novel catalytic systems. For instance, the use of 1,2-diselenolene-based ligands in transition metal catalysts has been shown to improve the selectivity and activity of a variety of catalytic reactions, including olefin polymerization and cross-coupling reactions.

Overall, the combination of unique structural and electronic properties, as well as non-innocent behavior, make 1,2-diselenolene metal complexes a promising class of compounds for a wide range of applications in chemistry and materials science. Continued investigation into the fundamental properties and reactivity of these compounds is likely to lead to further discoveries and innovations in these fields.
