= NOTT-202 =

Chemical compound

NOTT-202 is a two-part chemical compound that is capable of selectively absorbing carbon dioxide. It is a metal–organic framework (MOF) that functions like a sponge, adsorbing selected gases at high pressures. Its creation was announced by scientists in 2012. The researchers claimed this structure was an entirely new class of porous material.

Ligand/linker component of NOTT-202

It's based on indium and biphenyl-3,3′,5,5′-tetra(phenyl-4-carboxylic acid) ligand linkers.
