= Flexible metal-organic framework =

Material that responds to stimuli

Some metal-organic frameworks (MOF) display large structural changes as a response to external stimuli, and such modifications of their structure can, in turn, lead to drastic changes in their physical and chemical properties. Such stimuli-responsive MOFs are generally referred to as a flexible metal-organic frameworks. They can also be called dynamic metal-organic framework, stimuli-responsive MOFs, multi-functional MOFs, or soft porous crystals.

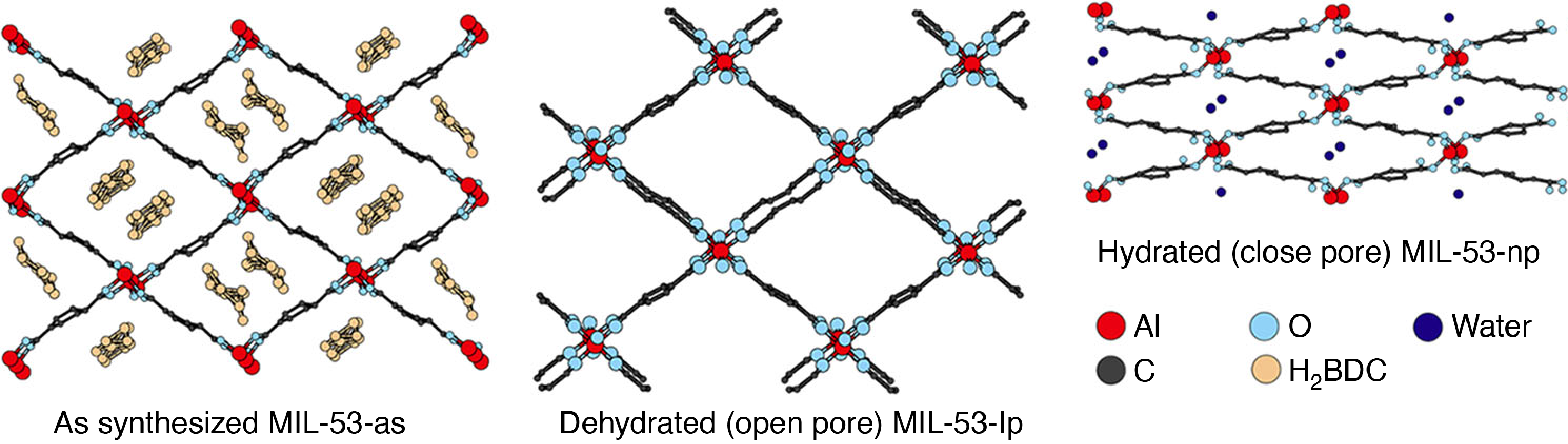
Demonstration of the flexibility of the MIL-53 metal-organic framework. Adapted from Hou et al.

Formally, a metal-organic framework is a coordination network with organic ligands containing potential voids. A coordination network is a coordination compound extending, through repeating coordination entities, in one dimension, but with cross-links between two or more individual chains, loops, or spiro-links, or a coordination compound extending through repeating coordination entities in two or three dimensions. A coordination polymer is a coordination compound with repeating coordination entities extending in one, two, or three dimensions.

Generally, this kind of material has a well-defined structure, but sometimes some external stimuli can affect its structure, resulting in a different structure without breaking the overall network. A variety of external stimuli like heat, light, solvent, an electric field, magnetic field, etc. can act upon a metal-organic framework, can act to change its internal structure, and can facilitate the transformation process. This structural transformation generally occurs by bond breaking/making, change of coordination number of the metal ion, change of coordination mode of ligand, ligand length squeezing, solvent exchange, solvent removal, etc.

One often discussed example of flexible metal-organic framework is the family of MIL-53 materials, featuring one-dimensional diamond-shaped pores that can expand or contract upon stimulation, such as adsorption of guest molecules (solvent, water, gases, etc.), changes in temperature, and mechanical pressure.

== See also ==
- Coordination chemistry
- Coordination polymers
- Metal–inorganic framework
- Organometallic chemistry
- Zeolitic imidazolate frameworks
- Solid sorbents for carbon capture
