= Diethylformamide =

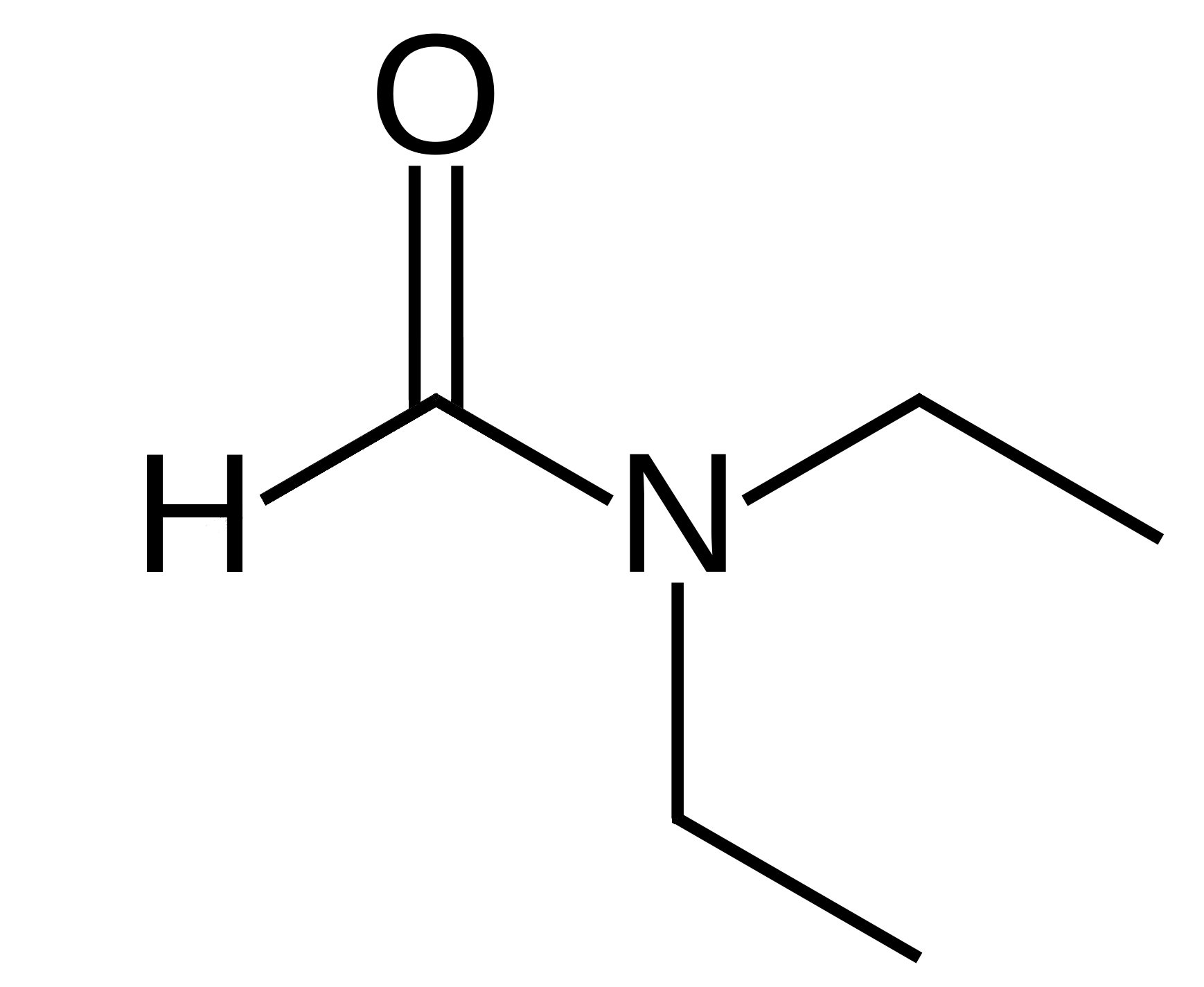

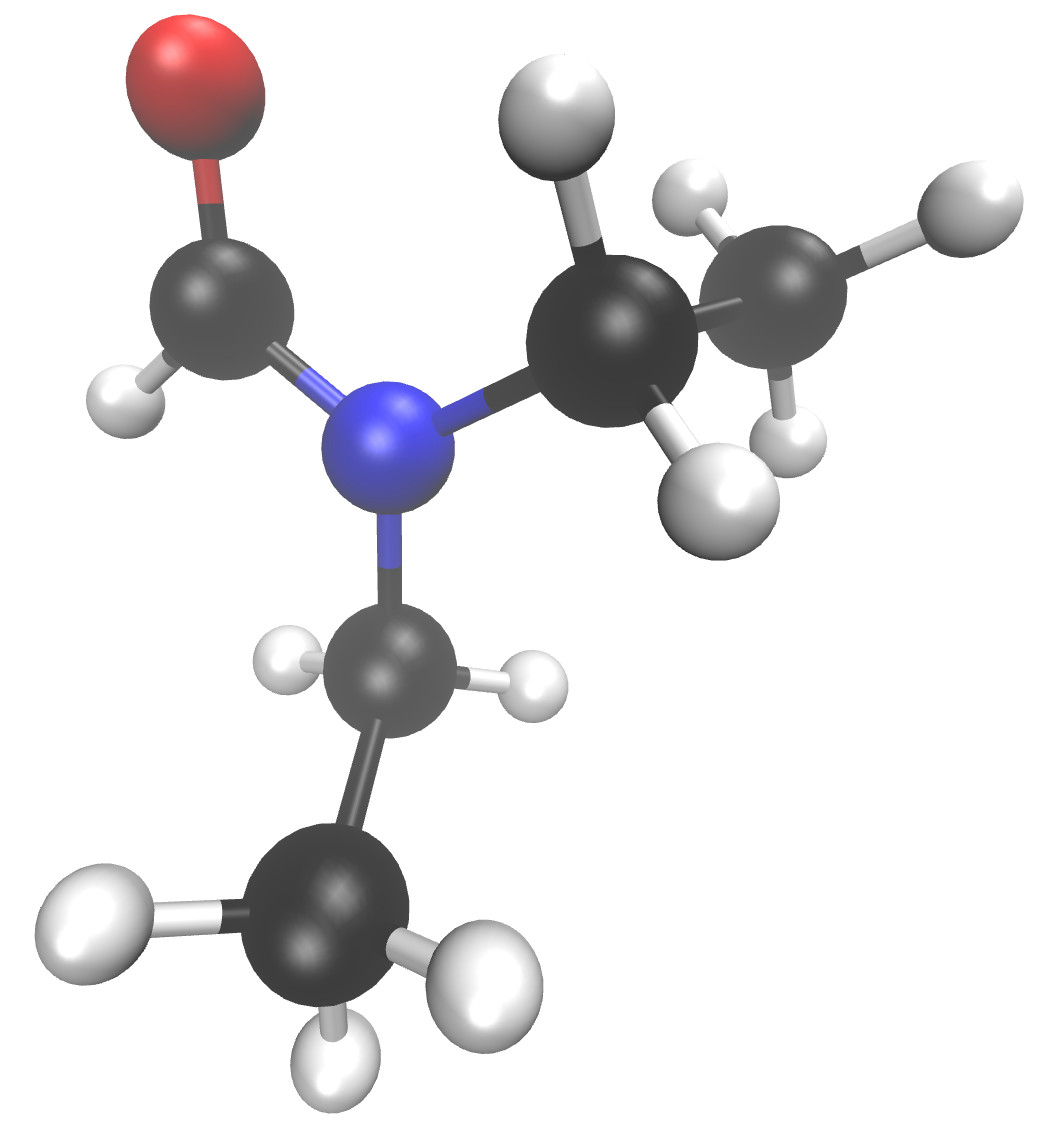

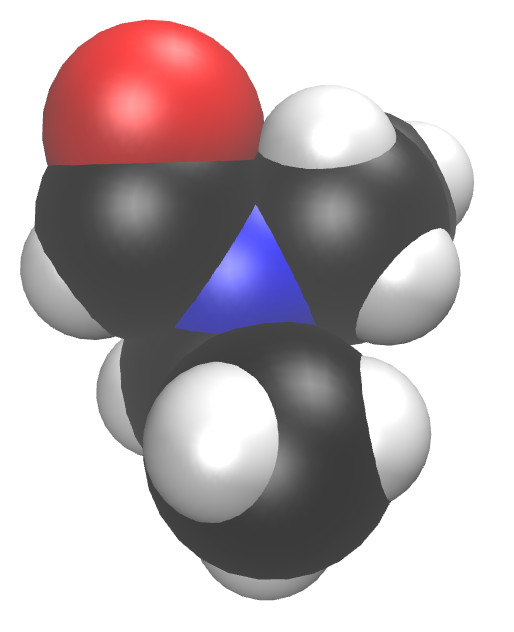

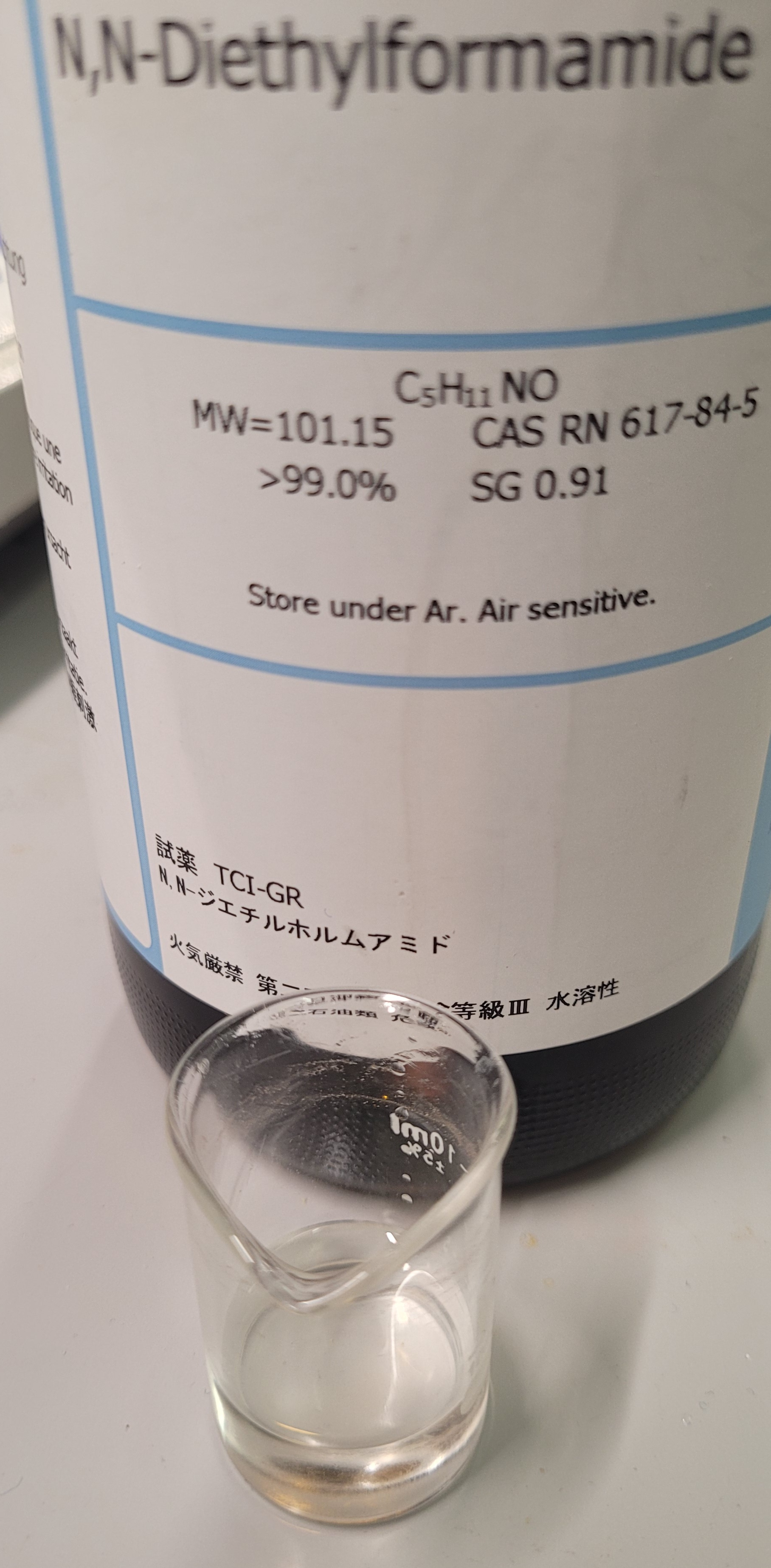

Names
- Preferred IUPAC name N,N-Diethylformamide
- Other names Diethylformamide, DEF

Identifiers
CAS Number	617-84-5
3D model (JSmol)	Interactive image
ChemSpider	11554
ECHA InfoCard	100.009.577
EC Number	210-533-2
PubChem CID	12051
UNII	D4BLP8BN9H
CompTox Dashboard (EPA)	DTXSID3020463
- InChI: InChI=InChI=1S/C5H11NO/c1-3-6(4-2)5-7/h5H,3-4H2,1-2H3 Key: SUAKHGWARZSWIH-UHFFFAOYSA-N
- SMILES: CCN(CC)C=O

Properties
Chemical formula	C_{5}H_{11}NO
Molar mass	101.149 g·mol^{−1}
Appearance	colorless liquid
Boiling point	176–177 °C (349–351 °F; 449–450 K)
- Except where otherwise noted, data are given for materials in their standard state (at 25 °C [77 °F], 100 kPa). Infobox references

Diethylformamide is an organic compound with the formula C_{5}H_{11}NO. As its name indicates, it is structurally related to formamide, having two ethyl groups in place of the two hydrogens. It is used in place of the related dimethylformamide for niche applications.

== Preparation ==
Diethylformamide may be prepared industrially by combining diethylamine and methyl formate at atmospheric pressure.

== Applications ==
Diethylformamide is used as a solvent in the production of metal–organic frameworks to be used for gas storage.
