= HKUST-1 =

Metal-organic framework material

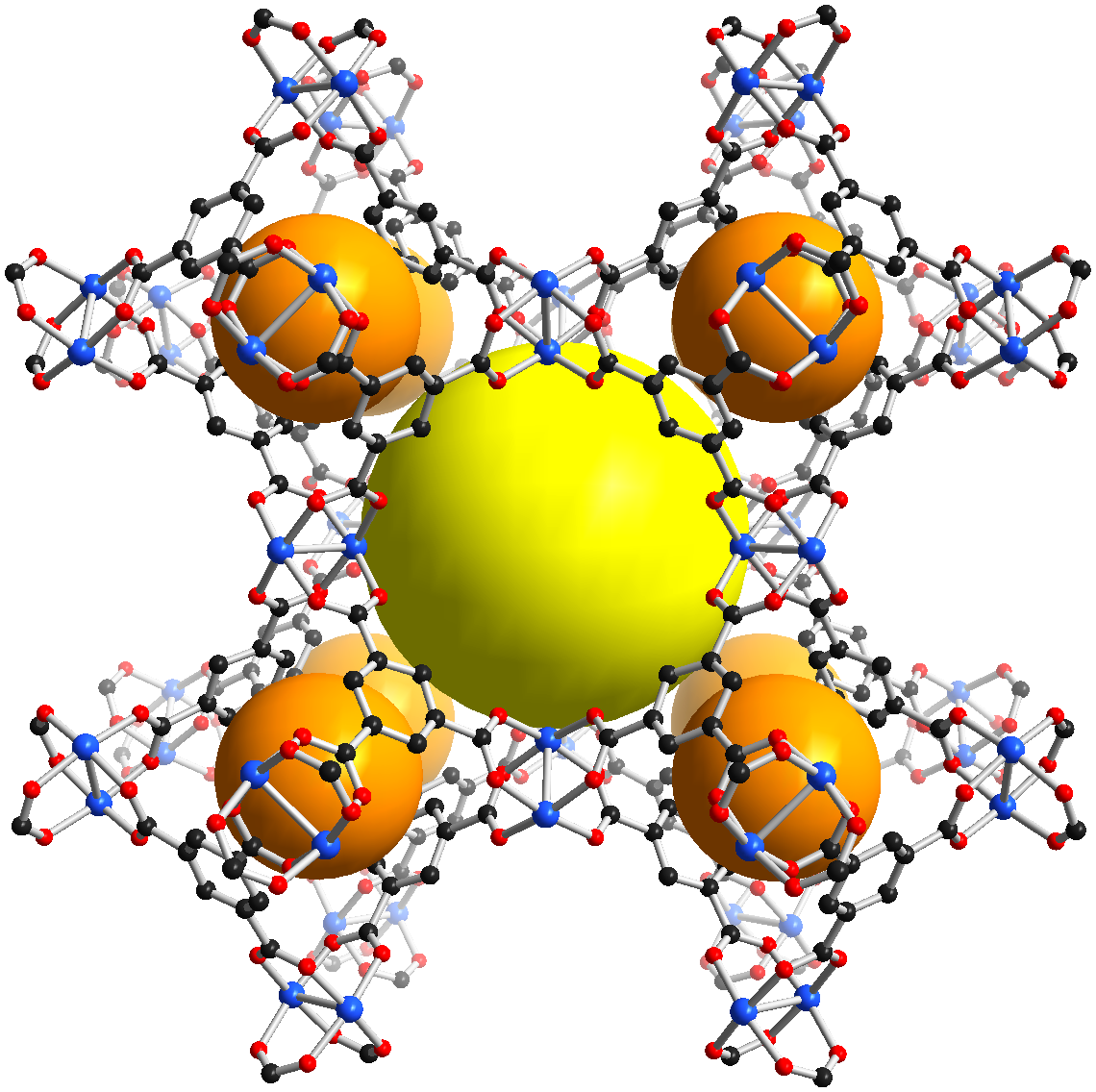
Framework structure of desolvated HKUST-1. The spheres represent two different types of pores within the framework structure. Blue: metal, red: oxygen, black: carbon.

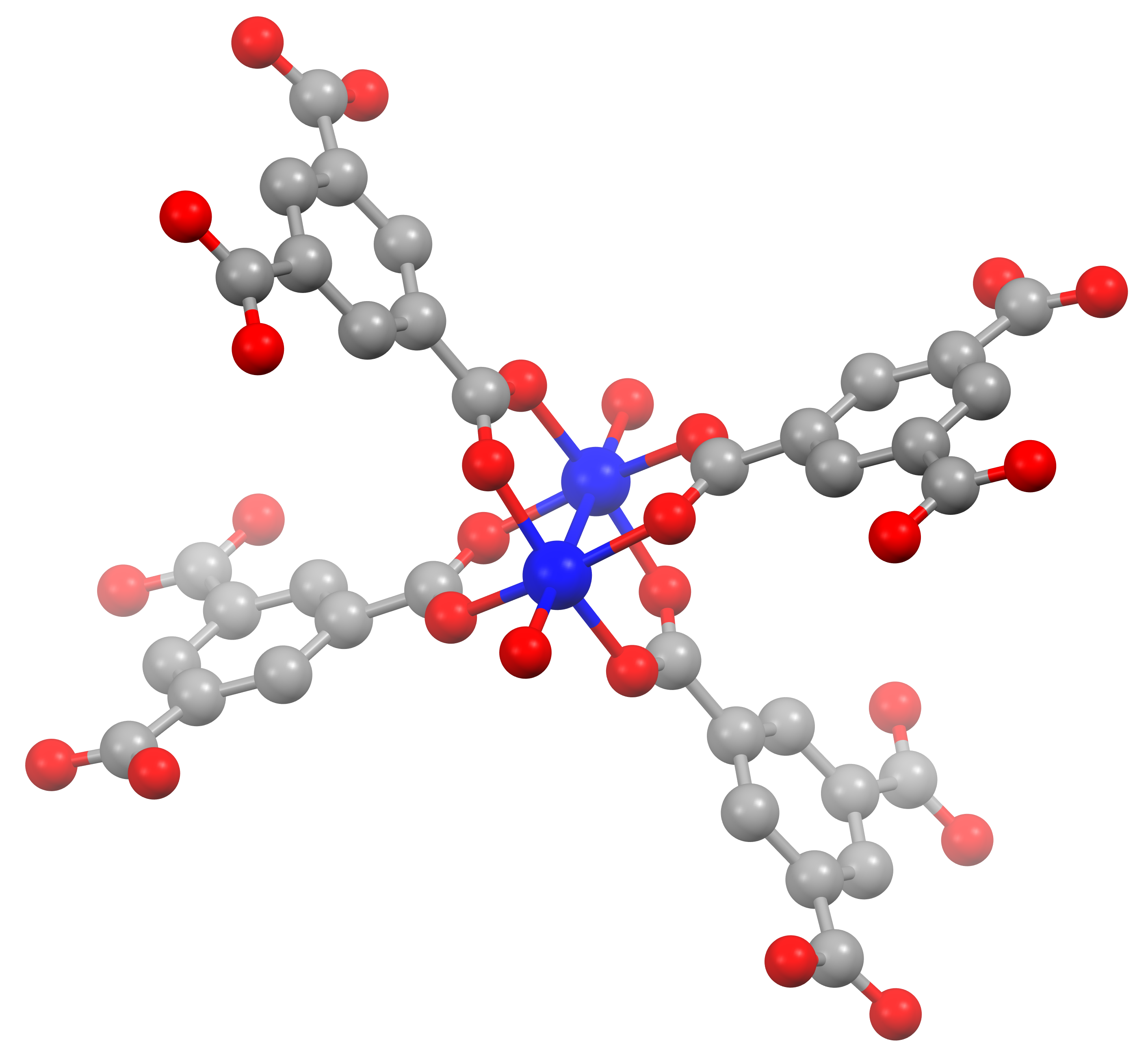
Paddlewheel unit (secondary building unit) of the HKUST-1 structure in the hydrated state. One water molecules is coordinated to each of metal center at the axial position.

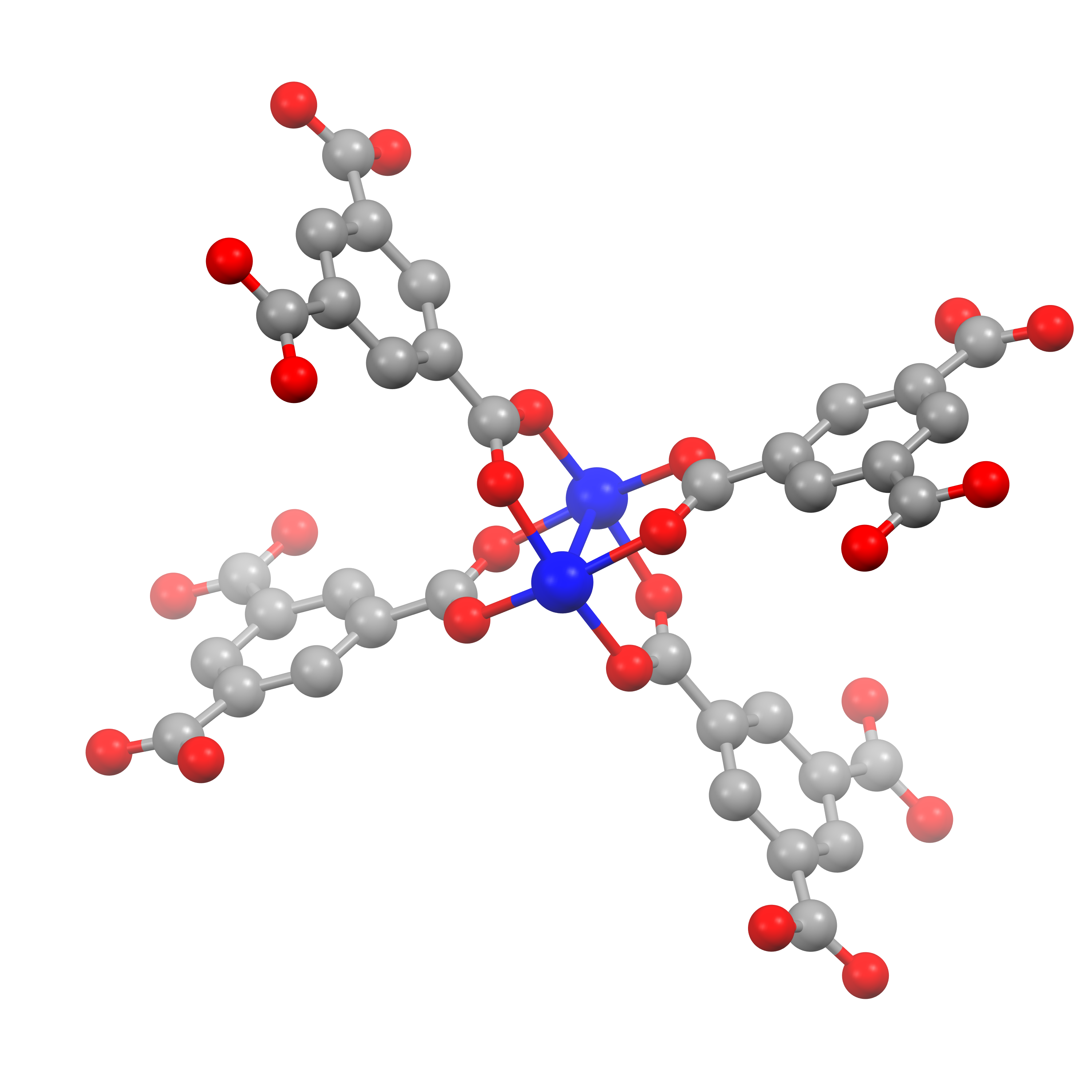
Paddlewheel unit (secondary building unit) of the HKUST-1 structure in the dehydrated state. The axial positions at the metal centers are not occupied (= coordinatively unsaturated site, CUS).

HKUST-1, also known as MOF-199, is a material in the class of metal-organic frameworks (MOFs). It is named after the Hong Kong University of Science and Technology. Metal-organic frameworks are crystalline materials, in which metals are linked by ligands (linker molecules) to form repeating coordination motives extending in three dimensions. The HKUST-1 framework is built up of dimeric metal units, which are connected by benzene-1,3,5-tricarboxylate linker molecules. The paddlewheel unit is the commonly used structural motif to describe the coordination environment of the metal centers and also called secondary building unit (SBU) of the HKUST-1 structure. The paddlewheel is built up of four benzene-1,3,5-tricarboxylate linkers molecules, which bridge two metal centers. One water molecules is coordinated to each of the two metal centers at the axial position of the paddlewheel unit in the hydrated state, which is usually found if the material is handled in air. After an activation process (heating, vacuum), these water molecules can be removed (dehydrated state) and the coordination site at the metal atoms is left unoccupied. This unoccupied coordination site is called coordinatively unsaturated site (CUS) and can be accessed by other molecules.

== Structural analogs ==
=== Monometallic HKUST-1 analogs ===
Cu^{2+} was used as metal center in the first synthesized HKUST-1 material, but the HKUST-1 structure was also obtained with other metals. The oxidation state of most used metals is +2, which results in a neutral overall framework. In the case of trivalent metals (oxidation state +3), the overall framework is positively charged and requires anions to compensate the charge and guarantee charge neutrality.

Overview of monometallic HKUST-1 analogs
Metal center and oxidation state	Year of first publication	Alternative name	Citation
Cu^{2+}	1999	Cu_{3}BTC_{2} CuBTC	
Mo^{2+}	2006	TUDMOF-1	
Fe^{2+/3+}	2007		
Cr^{2+}	2010		
Ni^{2+}	2011		
Zn^{2+}	2011		
Ru^{2+/3+}	2011		
Mn^{2+}	2012		
Fe^{2+}	2012		
Co^{2+}	2012		
Fe^{3+}	2014		
Ru^{2+}	2016		
Fe^{2+}	2019		

=== Mixed-metal HKUST-1 analogs ===
In addition to monometallic HKUST-1 analogs, several mixed-metal HKUST-1 materials were synthesized, in which two metals are incorporated into the framework structure at crystallographically equivalent positions. The incorporation of two metals can be achieved by using both metals for the synthesis (direct synthesis) or by using post-synthetic metal-exchange. For the post-synthetic metal exchange, a monometallic HKUST-1 material is synthesized in the first step. Subsequently, this monometallic HKUST-1 is suspended in a solution containing the second metal, which results in an exchange of metal centers in the framework leading to a mixed-metal HKUST-1.

Overview of mixed-metal HKUST-1 analogs
Metal centers and oxidation states	Metal ratios [-]	Synthesis method	Citation
Cu^{2+} / Zn^{2+}	0.99 : 0.01	Direct synthesis	
Cu^{2+} / Zn^{2+}	0.99 : 0.01 0.97 : 0.03 0.95 : 0.05 0.90 : 0.10 0.79 : 0.21	Direct synthesis	
Cu^{2+} / Zn^{2+}	0.95 : 0.05 0.90 : 0.10	Direct synthesis ball milling (mechanochemical)	
Cu^{2+} / Ni^{2+}	0.70 : 0.30 0.50 : 0.50 0.20 : 0.80	Direct synthesis	
Cu^{2+} / Ru^{3+}	0.92 : 0.08	Direct synthesis	
Cu^{2+} / Ag^{+}	not reported	Post-synthetic metal-exchange	
Cu^{2+} / Mn^{2+}	0.94 : 0.06	Post-synthetic metal-exchange	
Cu^{2+} / Fe^{3+}	0.86 : 0.14	Post-synthetic metal-exchange	
Cu^{2+} / Co^{2+}	0.74 : 0.26	Post-synthetic metal-exchange	
Cu^{2+} / Pd^{2+}	0.91 : 0.09 0.86 : 0.14 0.80 : 0.20	Direct synthesis	
Cu^{2+} / Pd^{2+}	0.81 : 0.19 0.59 : 0.41	Direct synthesis	
Ru^{2+/3+} / Rh^{2+}	0.95 : 0.05 0.89 : 0.11 0.79 : 0.21 0.47 : 0.53 0.24 : 0.76 0.03 : 0.97	Direct synthesis	
Cu^{2+} / Fe^{3+}	0.69 : 0.31	Direct synthesis	
Cu^{2+} / Zn^{2+} / Mo^{6+}	0.80 : 0.15 : 0.05 0.70 : 0.15 : 0.15 0.55 : 0.15 : 0.30	Direct synthesis ball milling (mechanochemical)	

=== Theoretically calculated HKUST-1 analogs ===
Several HKUST-1 analogs have already been synthesized, but several research groups have investigated the properties of the HKUST-1 structure by means of theoretical calculations. For this purpose, additional metal centers were incorporated into the framework on the theoretical level, which have not been used for the synthesis (e.g. Sc, V, Ti, W, Cd). Theoretical study on a mixed-metal HKUST-1 containing Cu in combination with various other metals (e.g. W, Re, Os, Ir, Pt, Au) were also reported, of which several metal combinations have not been synthesized.
