= Metal–organic framework =

Class of chemical substance

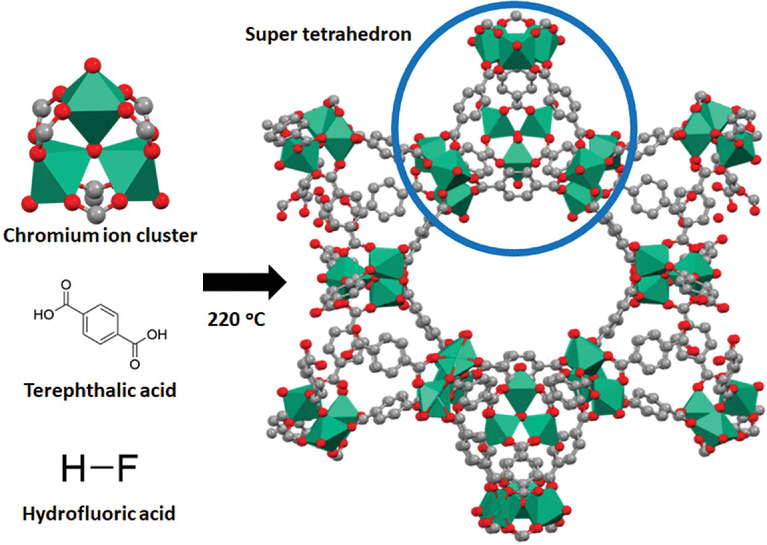
Synthesis of the MIL-101 MOF. Each green octahedron consists of one Cr atom in the center and six oxygen atoms (red balls) at the corners.

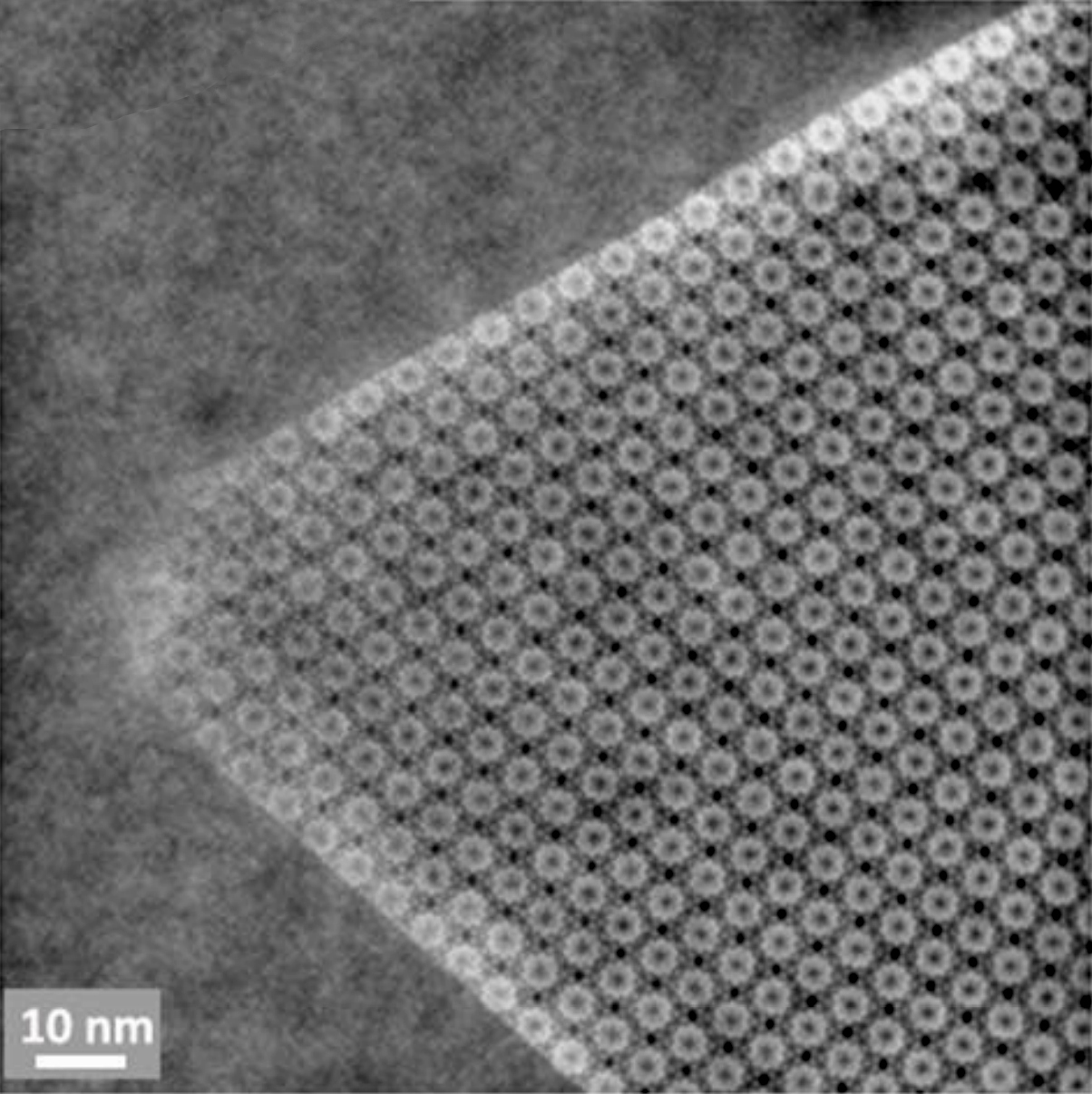
Electron micrograph of a MIL-101 crystal showing its supertetrahedra

Metal–organic frameworks (MOFs) are a class of coordination polymers built from metal nodes, discrete metal ions or metal-oxo clusters, commonly described as secondary building units (SBUs), joined by organic ligands to form one-, two-, or three-dimensional, typically porous frameworks. The ligands may be referred to as "struts" or "linkers", such as 1,4-benzenedicarboxylic acid (H_{2}bdc).

More formally, a metal–organic framework is a potentially porous extended structure made from metal ions and organic linkers. An extended structure is a structure whose sub-units occur in a constant ratio and are arranged in a repeating pattern. MOFs are a subclass of coordination networks, which is a coordination compound extending, through repeating entities, in one dimension, but with cross-links between two or more individual chains, loops, or spiro-links, or a coordination compound extending through repeating coordination entities in two or three dimensions. Coordination networks further belong to coordination polymers, which is a coordination compound with repeating coordination entities extending in one, two, or three dimensions. Most of the reported MOFs are crystalline compounds, but they can be amorphous, or reflect other disordered phases.

In most cases for MOFs, the pores are stable during the elimination of the guest molecules (often solvents) and could be refilled with other compounds. Because of this property, MOFs are of interest for the storage of gases such as hydrogen and carbon dioxide. Other possible applications of MOFs are in gas purification, in gas separation, in water remediation, in catalysis, as conducting solids and as supercapacitors.

The synthesis and properties of MOFs constitute the primary focus of reticular chemistry (from Latin reticulum, "small net"). In contrast to MOFs, covalent organic frameworks (COFs) are made entirely from light elements (H, B, C, N, and O) with extended structures.

Susumu Kitagawa, Richard Robson and Omar Yaghi were awarded the Nobel Prize in Chemistry in 2025 for their work on MOFs. Omar M. Yaghi also won 2022 VinFuture Special Prize for his work on discovering metal-organic frameworks.

== History ==
Although MOFs emerged as a distinct research field from the late 1990s on, their historical foundations extend considerably further back. Pioneering contributions by Hoskins and Robson (1990), Kondo et al. (1997), and Li et al. (1999) helped establish the deliberate construction of extended coordination frameworks and the experimental demonstration of permanent porosity as central themes of MOF chemistry. The history of zeolitic imidazolate frameworks (ZIFs) illustrates how earlier discoveries can precede their recognition within a modern materials class. In 1960, Jarvis and Wells described a three-dimensional copper(II)–imidazolate network, subsequently designated the J polymorph of [Cu(im)_{2}] (im = imidazolate). Brown and Aftergut reported the synthesis of the B polymorph in 1964, although its sodalite topology was established only in 2001 by Masciocchi and co-workers. Thus, this framework had already been prepared more than four decades before the introduction of the term ZIF in 2006. Following evidence of accessible porosity from low-temperature CO_{2} adsorption in 2024, Bosman and Telfer (2026) confirmed its permanent microporosity and demonstrated gas separation using pelletised material.

The delayed recognition of coordination polymers, or as later termed metal-organic frameworks, was a logical continuation of research on post-zeolite materials, while early contributions were forgotten for a long time. In 1989 Robson reported the first organic copper-based coordination network by complexation of anions with tetrahedral bridging ligands. Similar copper(I) coordination polymers have been synthesized in 1992 by Susumu Kitagawa, which contained pores with loosely bound acetone molecules, but the structure would collapse upon their removal. Further efforts were devoted to develop extended 3D porous networks that would be stable upon removal of guest molecule and would exhibit permanent porosity. In 1995, Omar M. Yaghi demonstrated interpenetrated 2-D structure with carboxylate-based linkers that remained stable upon guest removal and could re-adsorb specific aromatic molecules. Permanent porosity in 3-D coordination polymer was first demonstrated in 1997 by Susumu Kitagawa. A year later, Yaghi proposed a new synthetical concept that employs secondary building units (SBUs) — metal-carboxylate clusters that serve as rigid building blocks for constructing frameworks with permanent porosity. In 1999, Yaghi and colleagues used SBU approach to synthesize MOF-5 that consists of zinc oxide clusters and terephthalate linkers. MOF-5 exhibits strong bonds between metal centers and coordinating organic molecules and hence exhibits high thermal stability while maintaining high porosity..

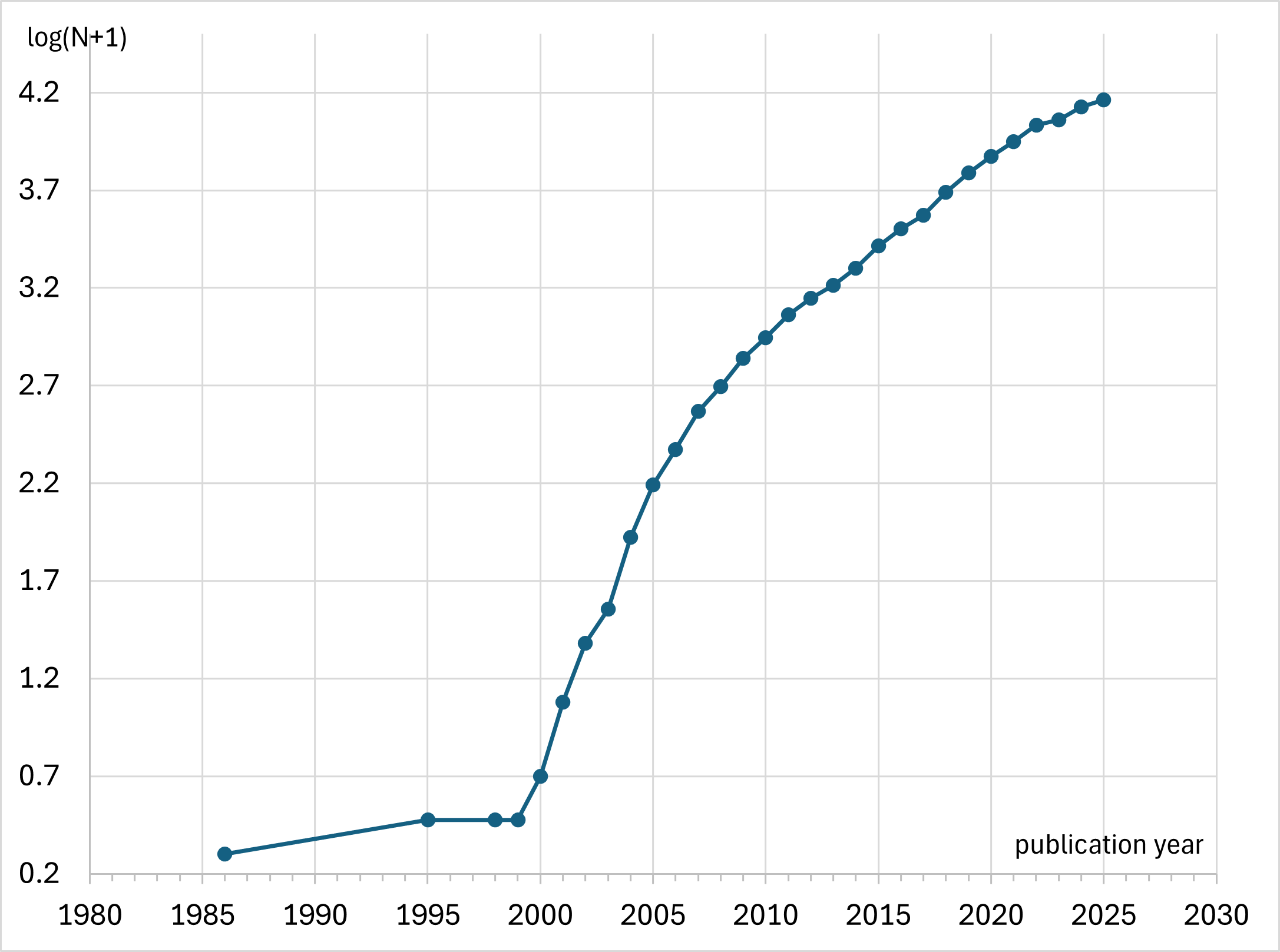
The number of non-patent publications about Metal Organic Frameworks by year according to Scopus database.

The field experienced a rapid development in the following years as shown by the inflection point at the year 2000 in the figure on the right.

== Structure ==
MOFs are composed of two main components: an inorganic metal cluster (often referred to as a secondary-building unit or SBU) and an organic molecule called a linker. For this reason, the materials are often referred to as hybrid organic-inorganic materials. The organic units are typically mono-, di-, tri-, or tetravalent ligands. The choice of metal and linker dictates the structure and hence properties of the MOF. For example, the metal's coordination preference influences the size and shape of pores by dictating how many ligands can bind to the metal, and in which orientation.

Classification of hybrid materials based on dimensionality
		Dimensionality of inorganic			
		0	1	2	3
Dimensionality of organic	0	Molecular complexes	Hybrid inorganic chains	Hybrid inorganic layers	3D inorganic hybrids
Dimensionality of organic	1	Chain coordination polymers	Mixed inorganic-organic layers	Mixed inorganic-organic 3D framework	
Dimensionality of organic	2	Layered coordination polymer	Mixed inorganic-organic 3D framework		
Dimensionality of organic	3	3D Coordination polymers			

To describe and organize the structures of MOFs, a system of nomenclature has been developed. Subunits of a MOF, called secondary building units (SBUs), can be described by topologies common to several structures. Each topology, also called a net, is assigned a symbol, consisting of three lower-case letters in bold. MOF-5, for example, has a pcu net.

Attached to the SBUs are bridging ligands. For MOFs, typical bridging ligands are di- and tricarboxylic acids. These ligands typically have rigid backbones. Examples are benzene-1,4-dicarboxylic acid (H_{2}bdc or terephthalic acid), biphenyl-4,4′-dicarboxylic acid (H_{2}bpdc), and the tricarboxylic acid trimesic acid.

A fundamental aspect in the development of MOFs is that their crystal structures can be determined by X-ray crystallographic techniques as often, many MOFs have good crystallinity allowing their 3D structures to be determined precisely. This has allowed to study reactions taking place within the MOF's channels, revealing the structures of reaction intermediates.

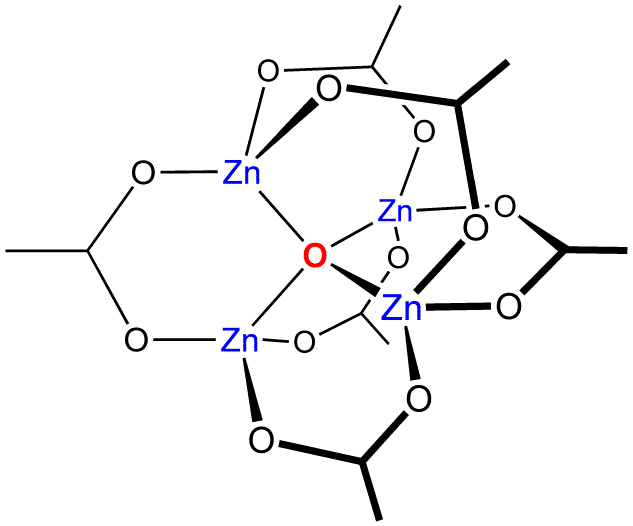
SBUs are often derived from basic zinc acetate structure, the acetates being replaced by rigid di- and tricarboxylates.

== Synthesis ==
=== General synthesis ===
The study of MOFs has roots in coordination chemistry and solid-state inorganic chemistry, but it developed into a new field. In addition, MOFs are constructed from bridging organic ligands that remain intact throughout the synthesis. Zeolite synthesis often makes use of a "template". Templates are ions that influence the structure of the growing inorganic framework. Typical templating ions are quaternary ammonium cations, which are removed later. In MOFs, the framework is templated by the SBU (secondary building unit) and the organic ligands. A templating approach that is useful for MOFs intended for gas storage is the use of metal-binding solvents such as N,N-diethylformamide and water. In these cases, metal sites are exposed when the solvent is evacuated, allowing hydrogen to bind at these sites.

Four developments were particularly important in advancing the chemistry of MOFs. (1) The geometric principle of construction where metal-containing units were kept in rigid shapes. Early MOFs contained single atoms linked to ditopic coordinating linkers. The approach not only led to the identification of a small number of preferred topologies that could be targeted in designed synthesis, but was the central point to achieve a permanent porosity. (2) The use of the isoreticular principle where the size and the nature of a structure changes without changing its topology led to MOFs with ultrahigh porosity and unusually large pore openings. (3) Post- synthetic modification of MOFs increased their functionality by reacting organic units and metal-organic complexes with linkers. (4) Multifunctional MOFs incorporated multiple functionalities in a single framework.

Since ligands in MOFs typically bind reversibly, the slow growth of crystals often allows defects to be redissolved, resulting in a material with millimeter-scale crystals and a near-equilibrium defect density. Solvothermal synthesis is useful for growing crystals suitable to structure determination, because crystals grow over the course of hours to days. However, the use of MOFs as storage materials for consumer products demands an immense scale-up of their synthesis. Scale-up of MOFs has not been widely studied, though several groups have demonstrated that microwaves can be used to nucleate MOF crystals rapidly from solution. This technique, termed "microwave-assisted solvothermal synthesis", is widely used in the zeolite literature, and produces micron-scale crystals in a matter of seconds to minutes, in yields similar to the slow growth methods.

Some MOFs, such as the mesoporous MIL-100(Fe), can be obtained under mild conditions at room temperature and in green solvents (water, ethanol) through scalable synthesis methods.

A solvent-free synthesis of a range of crystalline MOFs has been described. Usually the metal acetate and the organic proligand are mixed and ground up with a ball mill. Cu_{3}(BTC)_{2} can be quickly synthesised in this way in quantitative yield. In the case of Cu_{3}(BTC)_{2} the morphology of the solvent free synthesised product was the same as the industrially made Basolite C300. It is thought that localised melting of the components due to the high collision energy in the ball mill may assist the reaction. The formation of acetic acid as a by-product in the reactions in the ball mill may also help in the reaction having a solvent effect in the ball mill. It has been shown that the addition of small quantities of ethanol for the mechanochemical synthesis of Cu_{3}(BTC)_{2} significantly reduces the amounts of structural defects in the obtained material.

A recent advancement in the solvent-free preparation of MOF films and composites is their synthesis by chemical vapor deposition. This process, MOF-CVD, was first demonstrated for ZIF-8 and consists of two steps. In a first step, metal oxide precursor layers are deposited. In the second step, these precursor layers are exposed to sublimed ligand molecules, that induce a phase transformation to the MOF crystal lattice. Formation of water during this reaction plays a crucial role in directing the transformation. This process was successfully scaled up to an integrated cleanroom process, conforming to industrial microfabrication standards.

Numerous methods have been reported for the growth of MOFs as oriented thin films. However, these methods are suitable only for the synthesis of a small number of MOF topologies. One such example being the vapor-assisted conversion (VAC) which can be used for the thin film synthesis of several UiO-type MOFs.

=== High-throughput synthesis ===
High-throughput (HT) methods are a part of combinatorial chemistry and a tool for increasing efficiency. There are two synthetic strategies within the HT-methods: In the combinatorial approach, all reactions take place in one vessel, which leads to product mixtures. In the parallel synthesis, the reactions take place in different vessels. Furthermore, a distinction is made between thin films and solvent-based methods.

Solvothermal synthesis can be carried out conventionally in a teflon reactor in a convection oven or in glass reactors in a microwave oven (high-throughput microwave synthesis). The use of a microwave oven changes, in part dramatically, the reaction parameters.

In addition to solvothermal synthesis, there have been advances in using supercritical fluid as a solvent in a continuous flow reactor. Supercritical water was first used in 2012 to synthesize copper and nickel-based MOFs in just seconds. In 2020, supercritical carbon dioxide was used in a continuous flow reactor along the same time scale as the supercritical water-based method, but the lower critical point of carbon dioxide allowed for the synthesis of the zirconium-based MOF UiO-66.

==== High-throughput solvothermal synthesis ====
In high-throughput solvothermal synthesis, a solvothermal reactor with multiple cavities is used. Such a reactor is sometimes referred to as a multiclav. The reactor block or reactor insert is made of stainless steel and may contain, for example, 24 reaction chambers arranged in four rows. These miniaturized teflon reactors can hold up to 2 mL. The reactor block is sealed in a stainless steel autoclave with the filled reactors inserted into the bottom of the reactor, the teflon reactors are sealed with two teflon films, and the reactor top side is put on. The autoclave is then closed in a hydraulic press. The sealed solvothermal reactor is then subjected to a temperature-time program. The reusable teflon film serves to withstand the mechanical stress, while the disposable teflon film seals the reaction vessels. After the reaction, the products can be isolated and washed in parallel in a vacuum filter device. On the filter paper, the products are then present separately in a so-called sample library and can subsequently be characterized by automated X-ray powder diffraction. The informations obtained are then used to plan further syntheses.

=== Pseudomorphic replication ===
Pseudomorphic mineral replacement events occur whenever a mineral phase comes into contact with a fluid with which it is out of equilibrium. Re-equilibration will tend to take place to reduce the free energy and transform the initial phase into a more thermodynamically stable phase, involving dissolution and reprecipitation subprocesses.

Inspired by such geological processes, MOF thin films can be grown through the combination of atomic layer deposition (ALD) of aluminum oxide onto a suitable substrate (e.g. FTO) and subsequent solvothermal microwave synthesis. The aluminum oxide layer serves both as an architecture-directing agent and as a metal source for the backbone of the MOF structure. The construction of the porous 3D metal-organic framework takes place during the microwave synthesis, when the atomic layer deposited substrate is exposed to a solution of the requisite linker in a DMF/H_{2}O 3:1 mixture (v/v) at elevated temperature. Analogous, Kornienko and coworkers described in 2015 the synthesis of a cobalt-porphyrin MOF (Al_{2}(OH)_{2}tcpp-Co; H_{2}tcpp-=4,4′,4″,4‴-(porphyrin-5,10,15,20-tetrayl)tetrabenzoate), the first MOF catalyst constructed for the electrocatalytic conversion of aqueous CO_{2} to CO.

=== Post-synthetic modification ===
Although the three-dimensional structure and internal environment of the pores can be in theory controlled through proper selection of nodes and organic linking groups, the direct synthesis of such materials with the desired functionalities can be difficult due to the high sensitivity of MOF systems. Thermal and chemical sensitivity, as well as high reactivity of reaction materials, can make forming desired products challenging to achieve. The exchange of guest molecules and counter-ions and the removal of solvents allow for some additional functionality but are still limited to the integral parts of the framework. The post-synthetic exchange of organic linkers and metal ions is an expanding area of the field and opens up possibilities for more complex structures, increased functionality, and greater system control.

==== Ligand exchange ====
Post-synthetic modification techniques can be used to exchange an existing organic linking group in a prefabricated MOF with a new linker by ligand exchange or partial ligand exchange. This exchange allows for the pores and, in some cases the overall framework of MOFs, to be tailored for specific purposes. Some of these uses include fine-tuning the material for selective adsorption, gas storage, and catalysis. To perform ligand exchange prefabricated MOF crystals are washed with solvent and then soaked in a solution of the new linker. The exchange often requires heat and occurs on the time scale of a few days. Post-synthetic ligand exchange also enables the incorporation of functional groups into MOFs that otherwise would not survive MOF synthesis, due to temperature, pH, or other reaction conditions, or hinder the synthesis itself by competition with donor groups on the loaning ligand.

==== Metal exchange ====
Post-synthetic modification techniques can also be used to exchange an existing metal ion in a prefabricated MOF with a new metal ion by metal ion exchange. The complete metal metathesis from an integral part of the framework has been achieved without altering the framework or pore structure of the MOF. Similarly to post-synthetic ligand exchange, post-synthetic metal exchange is performed by washing prefabricated MOF crystals with solvent and then soaking the crystal in a solution of the new metal. Post-synthetic metal exchange allows for a simple route to the formation of MOFs with the same framework yet different metal ions.

==== Stratified synthesis ====
In addition to modifying the functionality of the ligands and metals themselves, post-synthetic modification can be used to expand upon the structure of the MOF. Using post-synthetic modification MOFs can be converted from an ordered crystalline material toward a heterogeneous porous material. Using post-synthetic techniques, it is possible for the controlled installation of domains within a MOF crystal which exhibit unique structural and functional characteristics. Core-shell MOFs and other layered MOFs have been prepared where layers have unique functionalization but in most cases are crystallographically compatible from layer to layer.

==== Open metal sites ====
In some cases MOF metal nodes have an unsaturated environment, and it is possible to modify this environment using different techniques. If the size of the ligand matches the size of the pore aperture, it is possible to install additional ligands to existing MOF structure. Sometimes metal nodes have a good binding affinity for inorganic species. For instance, it was shown that metal nodes can perform an extension, and create a bond with the uranyl cation.

== Gas separation ==
MOFs are predicted to be effective media for separating gases with low energy cost using computational high throughput screening from adsorption or gas breakthrough/diffusion properties. One example is NbOFFIVE-1-Ni (KAUST-7) which can separate propane and propylene via diffusion at nearly 100% selectivity. The specific molecule selectivity properties provided by Cu-BDC surface mounted metal organic framework (SURMOF-2) growth on alumina layer on top of back gated graphene field effect transistor (GFET) can provide a sensor that is sensitive only to ethanol, but not to methanol or isopropanol.

=== Carbon capture ===
The small, tunable pore sizes of MOFs and their high void fractions make them excellent adsorbents for the capture of CO_{2}. MOFs could provide a more efficient alternative to traditional amine solvent-based methods in CO_{2} capture from various souces, including the cement industry, natural gas combustion and biogas.

The flue gas or biogas would be fed through a MOF in a packed-bed reactor setup. Flue gas is generally 40 to 60 °C with a partial pressure of CO_{2} at 0.13 – 0.16 bar. CO_{2} can bind to the MOF surface through either physisorption (via Van der Waals interactions) or chemisorption (via covalent bond formation).

Once the MOF is saturated, the CO_{2} is desorbed through either a temperature swing or a pressure swing. This process is known as regeneration. In a temperature swing regeneration, the MOF would be heated until CO_{2} desorbs. To achieve working capacities comparable to the amine process, the MOF must be heated to around 200 °C. In a pressure swing, the pressure would be decreased until CO_{2} desorbs. In this way, the adsoprtion-desoprtion process is cyclic and the MOF is used over a period of many years.

A relevant MOF property for temperature-swing adsorption is their low heat capacity. Monoethanolamine (MEA) solutions, the leading capture method, have a heat capacity between 3-4 J/(g⋅K) since they are mostly water. This high heat capacity contributes to the energy penalty in the solvent regeneration step, i.e. when the adsorbed CO_{2} is removed from the MEA solution. MOF-177, a MOF designed for CO_{2} capture, has a heat capacity of 0.5 J/(g⋅K) at ambient temperature.

The companies Svante is commercialising CALF-20 for CO_{2} capture and Captivate Technology is using MUF-16.

=== Water vapor capture and dehumidification ===
Some MOFs can capture water vapor from ambient air. In 2021 under humid conditions, a polymer-MOF lab prototype yielded 17 liters (4.5 gal) of water per kg per day without added energy.

MOFs can be used to increase energy efficiency in room temperature space cooling applications.

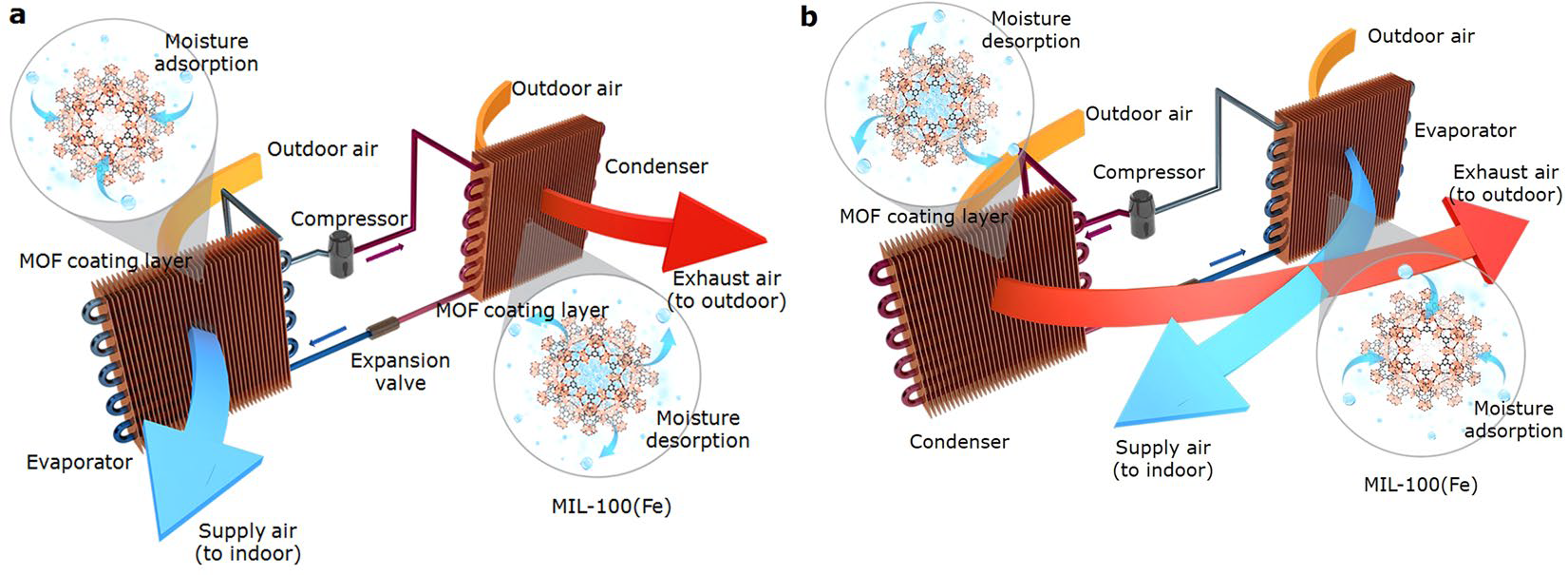
Schematic diagram for MOF dehumidification, featuring MIL-100(Fe), a MOF with particularly high water adsorption capacity

When cooling outdoor air, a cooling unit must deal with the air's sensible heat and latent heat. Typical vapor-compression air-conditioning (VCAC) units manage the latent heat in air through cooling fins held below the dew point temperature of the moist air at the intake. These fins condense the water, dehydrating and thus substantially reducing the air's heat content. Energy usage is dependent on the cooling coil's temperature and improves as the temperature of the coil rises above the dew point. This makes it desirable to handle dehumidification through means other than condensation. One such means is by adsorbing the water from the air into a desiccant coated onto the heat exchangers, using the waste heat exhausted from the unit to desorb the water from the sorbent and thus regenerate the desiccant. This is accomplished with two condenser/evaporator units through which the flow of refrigerant can be reversed once the desiccant is saturated, thus making the condenser the evaporator and vice versa.

MOFs' high surface areas and porosities have made them the subject of research in water adsorption applications. Chemistry can help tune the optimal relative humidity for adsorption/desorption, and the sharpness of the water uptake. MOF CAU-10-H is reported to triple the performance of silica gel, the standard desiccant.

CAU-10-H is reported to capture water at room temperature at relative humidity >18%. Heating the material to around 70 °C (158 °F) is sufficient to release the moisture, low enough to reach using solar heat or waste heat. Combining the material with conductive carbon structures enabled continuous operation with few-hour cycles. Capture rates are 1.8l/kg/day.

== Catalysis ==
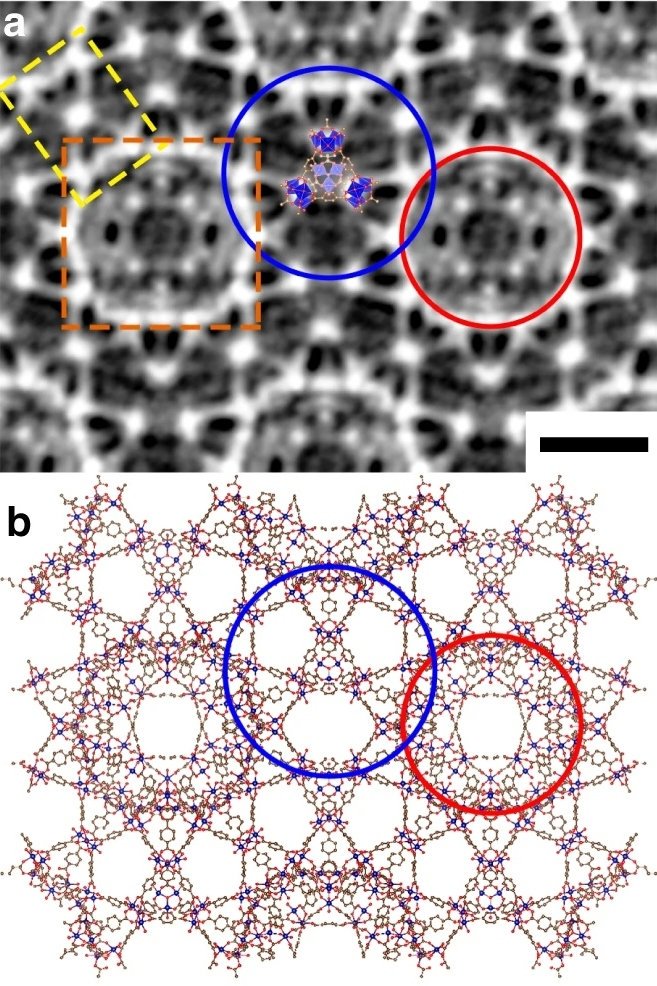
Electron micrograph and structure of MIL-101. Color codes: red – oxygen, brown – carbon, blue – chromium.

MOFs have potential as heterogeneous catalysts, although applications have not been commercialized. Their high surface area, tunable porosity, diversity in metal and functional groups make them especially attractive for use as catalysts. Like other heterogeneous catalysts, MOFs may allow for easier post-reaction separation and recyclability than homogeneous catalysts. In some cases, they also give an enhanced catalyst stability. Additionally, they typically offer substrate-size selectivity. Nevertheless, while clearly important for reactions in living systems, selectivity on the basis of substrate size is of limited value in abiotic catalysis, as reasonably pure feedstocks are generally available.Enantiopure chiral ligands or their metal complexes have been incorporated into MOFs to lead to efficient asymmetric catalysts. Even some MOF materials may bridge the gap between zeolites and enzymes when they combine isolated polynuclear sites, dynamic host–guest responses, and a hydrophobic cavity environment. Theoretical calculations show that MOFs are semiconductors or insulators with band gaps between 1.0 and 5.5 eV which can be altered by changing the degree of conjugation in the ligands indicating its possibility for being photocatalysts.

Useful comparisons can be made with zeolites, which are extraordinarily useful in catalysis; however, zeolites are limited by the fixed tetrahedral coordination of the Si/Al connecting points and the two-coordinated oxide linkers, and fewer than 200 zeolites are known. In contrast with this limited scope, MOFs exhibit more diverse coordination geometries, polytopic linkers, and ancillary ligands (F^{−}, OH^{−}, H_{2}O among others). It is also difficult to obtain zeolites with pore sizes larger than 1 nm, which limits the catalytic applications of zeolites to relatively small organic molecules (typically no larger than xylenes). Furthermore, mild synthetic conditions typically employed for MOF synthesis allow direct incorporation of delicate functionalities into the framework structures. Such a process would not be possible with zeolites or other microporous crystalline oxide-based materials because of the harsh conditions typically used for their synthesis (e.g., calcination at high temperatures to remove organic templates). Metal–organic framework MIL-101 is one of the most used MOFs for catalysis incorporating different transition metals such as Cr. However, the stability of some MOF photocatalysts in aqueous medium and under strongly oxidizing conditions is low. Zeolites still cannot be obtained in enantiopure form, which precludes their applications in catalytic asymmetric synthesis.

=== Design ===
==== Metal ions or metal clusters ====
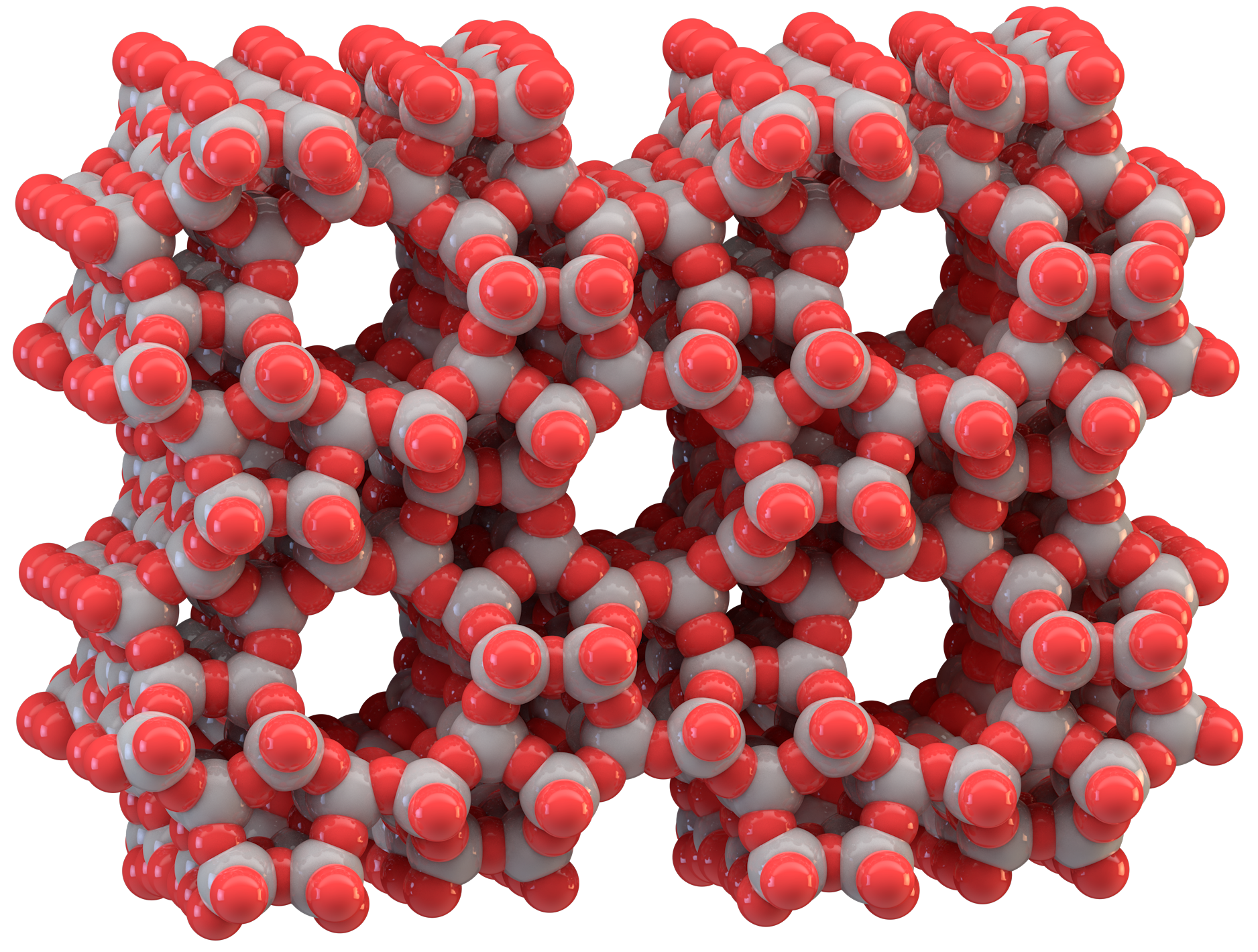
Example of zeolite catalyst

Among the earliest reports of MOF-based catalysis was the cyanosilylation of aldehydes by a 2D MOF (layered square grids) of formula Cd(4,4′-bpy)_{2}(NO_{3})_{2}. This investigation centered mainly on size- and shape-selective clathration. A second set of examples was based on a two-dimensional, square-grid MOF containing single Pd(II) ions as nodes and 2-hydroxypyrimidinolates as struts. Despite initial coordinative saturation, the palladium centers in this MOF catalyze alcohol oxidation, olefin hydrogenation, and Suzuki C–C coupling. At a minimum, these reactions necessarily entail redox oscillations of the metal nodes between Pd(II) and Pd(0) intermediates accompanying by drastic changes in coordination number, which would certainly lead to destabilization and potential destruction of the original framework if all the Pd centers are catalytically active. The observation of substrate shape- and size-selectivity implies that the catalytic reactions are heterogeneous and are indeed occurring within the MOF. Nevertheless, at least for hydrogenation, it is difficult to rule out the possibility that catalysis is occurring at the surface of MOF-encapsulated palladium clusters/nanoparticles (i.e., partial decomposition sites) or defect sites, rather than at transiently labile, but otherwise intact, single-atom MOF nodes. "Opportunistic" MOF-based catalysis has been described for the cubic compound, MOF-5. This material comprises coordinatively saturated Zn_{4}O nodes and fully complexed BDC struts (see above for abbreviation); yet it apparently catalyzes the Friedel–Crafts tert-butylation of both toluene and biphenyl. Furthermore, para alkylation is strongly favored over ortho alkylation, a behavior thought to reflect the encapsulation of reactants by the MOF.

==== Functional struts ====
The porous-framework material [Cu_{3}(btc)_{2}(H_{2}O)_{3}], also known as HKUST-1, contains large cavities having windows of diameter ~6 Å. The coordinated water molecules are easily removed, leaving open Cu(II) sites. Kaskel and co-workers showed that these Lewis acid sites could catalyze the cyanosilylation of benzaldehyde or acetone. The anhydrous version of HKUST-1 is an acid catalyst. Compared to Brønsted vs. Lewis acid-catalyzed pathways, the product selectivity are distinctive for three reactions: isomerization of α-pinene oxide, cyclization of citronellal, and rearrangement of α-bromoacetals, indicating that indeed [Cu_{3}(btc)_{2}] functions primarily as a Lewis acid catalyst. The product selectivity and yield of catalytic reactions (e.g. cyclopropanation) have also been shown to be impacted by defective sites, such as Cu(I) or incompletely deprotonated carboxylic acid moities of the linkers.

MIL-101, a large-cavity MOF having the formula [Cr_{3}F(H_{2}O)_{2}O(BDC)_{3}], is a cyanosilylation catalyst. The coordinated water molecules in MIL-101 are easily removed to expose Cr(III) sites. As one might expect, given the greater Lewis acidity of Cr(III) vs. Cu(II), MIL-101 is much more active than HKUST-1 as a catalyst for the cyanosilylation of aldehydes. Additionally, the Kaskel group observed that the catalytic sites of MIL-101, in contrast to those of HKUST-1, are immune to unwanted reduction by benzaldehyde. The Lewis-acid-catalyzed cyanosilylation of aromatic aldehydes has also been carried out by Long and co-workers using a MOF of the formula Mn_{3}[(Mn_{4}Cl)_{3}btt_{8}(CH_{3}OH)_{10}]. This material contains a three-dimensional pore structure, with the pore diameter equaling 10 Å. In principle, either of the two types of Mn(II) sites could function as a catalyst. Noteworthy features of this catalyst are high conversion yields (for small substrates) and good substrate-size-selectivity, consistent with channellocalized catalysis.

==== Encapsulated catalysts ====
The MOF encapsulation approach invites comparison to earlier studies of oxidative catalysis by zeolite-encapsulated Fe(porphyrin) as well as Mn(porphyrin) systems. The zeolite studies generally employed iodosylbenzene (PhIO), rather than TPHP as oxidant. The difference is likely mechanistically significant, thus complicating comparisons. Briefly, PhIO is a single oxygen atom donor, while TBHP is capable of more complex behavior. In addition, for the MOF-based system, it is conceivable that oxidation proceeds via both oxygen transfer from a manganese oxo intermediate as well as a manganese-initiated radical chain reaction pathway. Regardless of mechanism, the approach is a promising one for isolating and thereby stabilizing the porphyrins against both oxo-bridged dimer formation and oxidative degradation.

==== Metal-free organic cavity modifiers ====
Most examples of MOF-based catalysis make use of metal ions or atoms as active sites. Among the few exceptions are two nickel- and two copper-containing MOFs synthesized by Rosseinsky and co-workers. These compounds employ amino acids (L- or D-aspartate) together with dipyridyls as struts. The coordination chemistry is such that the amine group of the aspartate cannot be protonated by added HCl, but one of the aspartate carboxylates can. Thus, the framework-incorporated amino acid can exist in a form that is not accessible for the free amino acid. While the nickel-based compounds are marginally porous, on account of tiny channel dimensions, the copper versions are clearly porous. The Rosseinsky group showed that the carboxylic acids behave as Brønsted acidic catalysts, facilitating (in the copper cases) the ring-opening methanolysis of a small, cavity-accessible epoxide at up to 65% yield. Superior homogeneous catalysts exist however.

Kitagawa and co-workers have reported the synthesis of a catalytic MOF having the formula [Cd(4-btapa)_{2}(NO_{3})_{2}]. The MOF is three-dimensional, consisting of an identical catenated pair of networks, yet still featuring pores of molecular dimensions. The nodes consist of single cadmium ions, octahedrally ligated by pyridyl nitrogens. From a catalysis standpoint, however, the most interesting feature of this material is the presence of guest-accessible amide functionalities. The amides are capable of base-catalyzing the Knoevenagel condensation of benzaldehyde with malononitrile. Reactions with larger nitriles, however, are only marginally accelerated, implying that catalysis takes place chiefly within the material's channels rather than on its exterior. A noteworthy finding is the lack of catalysis by the free strut in homogeneous solution, evidently due to intermolecular H-bonding between bptda molecules. Thus, the MOF architecture elicits catalytic activity not otherwise encountered.

In an interesting alternative approach, Férey and coworkers were able to modify the interior of MIL-101 via Cr(III) coordination of one of the two available nitrogen atoms of each of several ethylenediamine molecules. The free non-coordinated ends of the ethylenediamines were then used as Brønsted basic catalysts, again for Knoevenagel condensation of benzaldehyde with nitriles.

A third approach has been described by Kim Kimoon and coworkers. Using a pyridine-functionalized derivative of tartaric acid and a Zn(II) source they were able to synthesize a 2D MOF termed POST-1. POST-1 possesses 1D channels whose cross sections are defined by six trinuclear zinc clusters and six struts. While three of the six pyridines are coordinated by zinc ions, the remaining three are protonated and directed toward the channel interior. When neutralized, the noncoordinated pyridyl groups are found to catalyze transesterification reactions, presumably by facilitating deprotonation of the reactant alcohol. The absence of significant catalysis when large alcohols are employed strongly suggests that the catalysis occurs within the channels of the MOF.

=== Achiral catalysis ===
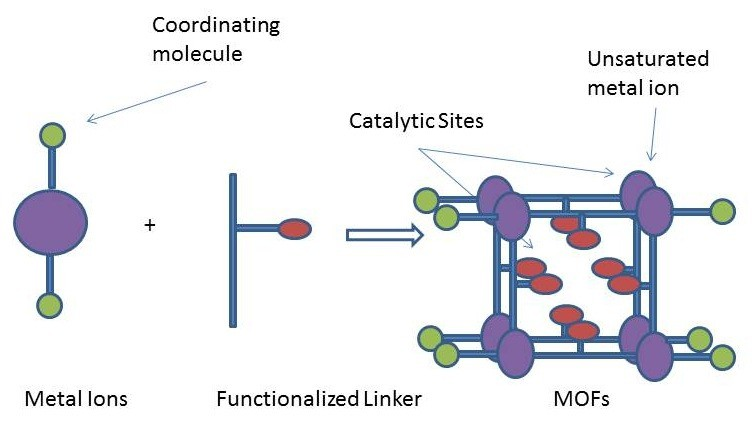
Schematic Diagram for MOF Catalysis

==== Metals as catalytic sites ====
The metals in the MOF structure often act as Lewis acids. The metals in MOFs often coordinate to labile solvent molecules or counter ions which can be removed after activation of the framework. The Lewis acidic nature of such unsaturated metal centers can activate the coordinated organic substrates for subsequent organic transformations. The use of unsaturated metal centers was demonstrated in the cyanosilylation of aldehydes and imines by Makoto Fujita and coworkers in 2004. They reported MOF of composition {[Cd(4,4′-bpy)_{2}(H_{2}O)_{2}] • (NO_{3})_{2} • 4H_{2}O} which was obtained by treating linear bridging ligand 4,4′-bipyridine (bpy) with Cd(NO_{3})_{2}. The Cd(II) centers in this MOF possess a distorted octahedral geometry having four pyridines in the equatorial positions, and two water molecules in the axial positions to form a two-dimensional infinite network. On activation, two water molecules were removed leaving the metal centers unsaturated and Lewis acidic. The Lewis acidic character of metal center was tested on cyanosilylation reactions of imine where the imine gets attached to the Lewis-acidic metal centre resulting in higher electrophilicity of imines. For the cyanosilylation of imines, most of the reactions were complete within 1 h affording aminonitriles in quantitative yield. Kaskel and coworkers carried out similar cyanosilylation reactions with coordinatively unsaturated metals in three-dimensional (3D) MOFs as heterogeneous catalysts. The 3D framework [Cu_{3}(btc)_{2}(H_{2}O)_{3}] (btc: benzene-1,3,5-tricarboxylate) (HKUST-1) used in this study was first reported by Williams et al. The open framework of [Cu_{3}(btc)_{2}(H_{2}O)_{3}] is built from dimeric cupric tetracarboxylate units (paddle-wheels) with aqua molecules coordinating to the axial positions and btc bridging ligands. The resulting framework after removal of two water molecules from axial positions possesses porous channel. This activated MOF catalyzes the trimethylcyanosilylation of benzaldehydes with a low conversion (<5% in 24 h) at 293 K. As the reaction temperature was raised to 313 K, a good conversion of 57% with a selectivity of 89% was obtained after 72 h. In comparison, less than 10% conversion was observed for the background reaction (without MOF) under the same conditions. But this strategy suffers from some problems like 1) the decomposition of the framework with increase of the reaction temperature due to the reduction of Cu(II) to Cu(I) by aldehydes; 2) strong solvent inhibition effect; electron donating solvents such as THF competed with aldehydes for coordination to the Cu(II) sites, and no cyanosilylation product was observed in these solvents; 3) the framework instability in some organic solvents. Several other groups have also reported the use of metal centres in MOFs as catalysts. Again, electron-deficient nature of some metals and metal clusters makes the resulting MOFs efficient oxidation catalysts. Mori and coworkers reported MOFs with Cu_{2} paddle wheel units as heterogeneous catalysts for the oxidation of alcohols. The catalytic activity of the resulting MOF was examined by carrying out alcohol oxidation with H_{2}O_{2} as the oxidant. It also catalyzed the oxidation of primary alcohol, secondary alcohol and benzyl alcohols with high selectivity. Hill et al. have demonstrated the sulfoxidation of thioethers using a MOF based on vanadium-oxo cluster V_{6}O_{13} building units. A MOF loaded with propylene oxide can act as a catalyst, converting CO_{2} into cyclic carbonates (ring-shaped molecules with many applications). They can also remove carbon from biogas. This MOF is based on lanthanides, which provide chemical stability. This is especially important because the gases the MOF will be exposed to are hot, high in humidity, and acidic. Triaminoguanidinium-based POFs and Zn/POFs are new multifunctional materials for environmental remediation and biomedical applications.

==== Functional linkers as catalytic sites ====
Functional linkers can be also utilized as catalytic sites. A 3D MOF {[Cd(4-btapa)_{2}(NO_{3})_{2}] • 6H_{2}O • 2dmf} (H_{3}4-btapa= 1,3,5-benzene tricarboxylic acid tris [N-(4-pyridyl)amide], dmf = N,N-dimethylformamide) constructed by tridentate amide linkers and cadmium salt catalyzes the Knoevenagel condensation reaction. The pyridine groups on the ligand 4-BTAPA act as ligands binding to the octahedral cadmium centers, while the amide groups can provide the functionality for interaction with the incoming substrates. Specifically, the −NH moiety of the amide group can act as electron acceptor whereas the C=O group can act as electron donor to activate organic substrates for subsequent reactions. Ferey et al. reported a robust and porous MOF [Cr_{3}(μ_{3}-O)F(H_{2}O)_{2}(BDC)_{3}] (BDC: benzene-1,4-dicarboxylate) where instead of directly using the unsaturated Cr(III) centers as catalytic sites, the authors grafted ethylenediamine (ed) onto the Cr(III) sites. The uncoordinated ends of ed can act as base catalytic sites. ed-grafted MOF was investigated for Knoevenagel condensation reactions. A significant increase in conversion was observed for ed-grafted MOF compared to untreated framework (98% vs. 36%). Another example of linker modification to generate catalytic site is iodo-functionalized well-known Al-based MOFs (MIL-53 and DUT-5) and Zr-based MOFs (UiO-66 and UiO-67) for the catalytic oxidation of diols.

==== Entrapment of catalytically active noble metal nanoparticles ====
The entrapment of catalytically active noble metals can be accomplished by grafting on functional groups to the unsaturated metal site on MOFs. Ethylenediamine (ED) has been shown to be grafted on the Cr metal sites and can be further modified to encapsulate noble metals such as Pd. The entrapped Pd has similar catalytic activity as Pd/C in the Heck reaction. Ruthenium nanoparticles have catalytic activity in a number of reactions when entrapped in the MOF-5 framework. This Ru-encapsulated MOF catalyzes oxidation of benzyl alcohol to benzaldehyde, although degradation of the MOF occurs. The same catalyst was used in the hydrogenation of benzene to cyclohexane. In another example, Pd nanoparticles embedded within defective HKUST-1 framework enable the generation of tunable Lewis basic sites. Therefore, this multifunctional Pd/MOF composite is able to perform stepwise benzyl alcohol oxidation and Knoevenagel condensation.

==== Reaction hosts with size selectivity ====
MOFs might prove useful for both photochemical and polymerization reactions due to the tuneability of the size and shape of their pores. A 3D MOF {[Co(bpdc)_{3}(bpy)] • 4dmf • H_{2}O} (bpdc: biphenyldicarboxylate, bpy: 4,4′-bipyridine) was synthesized by Li and coworkers. Using this MOF photochemistry of o-methyl dibenzyl ketone (o-MeDBK) was extensively studied. This molecule was found to have a variety of photochemical reaction properties including the production of cyclopentanol. MOFs have been used to study polymerization in the confined space of MOF channels. Polymerization reactions in confined space might have different properties than polymerization in open space. Styrene, divinylbenzene, substituted acetylenes, methyl methacrylate, and vinyl acetate have all been studied by Kitagawa and coworkers as possible activated monomers for radical polymerization. Due to the different linker size the MOF channel size could be tunable on the order of roughly 25 and 100 Å^{2}. The channels were shown to stabilize propagating radicals and suppress termination reactions when used as radical polymerization sites.

=== Asymmetric catalysis ===
Several strategies exist for constructing homochiral MOFs. Crystallization of homochiral MOFs via self-resolution from achiral linker ligands is one of the way to accomplish such a goal. However, the resulting bulk samples contain both enantiomorphs and are racemic. Aoyama and coworkers successfully obtained homochiral MOFs in the bulk from achiral ligands by carefully controlling nucleation in the crystal growth process. Zheng and coworkers reported the synthesis of homochiral MOFs from achiral ligands by chemically manipulating the statistical fluctuation of the formation of enantiomeric pairs of crystals. Growing MOF crystals under chiral influences is another approach to obtain homochiral MOFs using achiral linker ligands. Rosseinsky and coworkers have introduced a chiral coligand to direct the formation of homochiral MOFs by controlling the handedness of the helices during the crystal growth. Morris and coworkers utilized ionic liquid with chiral cations as reaction media for synthesizing MOFs, and obtained homochiral MOFs. The most straightforward and rational strategy for synthesizing homochiral MOFs is, however, to use the readily available chiral linker ligands for their construction.

==== Homochiral MOFs with interesting functionalities and reagent-accessible channels ====
Homochiral MOFs have been made by Lin and coworkers using 2,2′-bis(diphenylphosphino)-1,1′-binaphthyl (BINAP) and 1,1′-bi-2,2′-naphthol (BINOL) as chiral ligands. These ligands can coordinate with catalytically active metal sites to enhance the enantioselectivity. A variety of linking groups such as pyridine, phosphonic acid, and carboxylic acid can be selectively introduced to the 3,3′, 4,4′, and the 6,6′ positions of the 1,1'-binaphthyl moiety. Moreover, by changing the length of the linker ligands the porosity and framework structure of the MOF can be selectively tuned.

==== Postmodification of homochiral MOFs ====
Lin and coworkers have shown that the postmodification of MOFs can be achieved to produce enantioselective homochiral MOFs for use as catalysts. The resulting 3D homochiral MOF {[Cd_{3}(L)_{3}Cl_{6}] • 4DMF • 6MeOH • 3H_{2}O} (L=(R)-6,6'-dichloro-2,2'-dihydroxyl-1,1'-binaphthyl-bipyridine) synthesized by Lin was shown to have a similar catalytic efficiency for the diethylzinc addition reaction as compared to the homogeneous analogue when was pretreated by Ti(O^{i}Pr)_{4} to generate the grafted Ti- BINOLate species. The catalytic activity of MOFs can vary depending on the framework structure. Lin and others found that MOFs synthesized from the same materials could have drastically different catalytic activities depending on the framework structure present.

==== Homochiral MOFs with precatalysts as building blocks ====
Another approach to construct catalytically active homochiral MOFs is to incorporate chiral metal complexes which are either active catalysts or precatalysts directly into the framework structures. For example, Hupp and coworkers have combined a chiral ligand and bpdc (bpdc: biphenyldicarboxylate) with Zn(NO_{3})_{2} and obtained twofold interpenetrating 3D networks. The orientation of chiral ligand in the frameworks makes all Mn(III) sites accessible through the channels. The resulting open frameworks showed catalytic activity toward asymmetric olefin epoxidation reactions. No significant decrease of catalyst activity was observed during the reaction and the catalyst could be recycled and reused several times. Lin and coworkers have reported zirconium phosphonate-derived Ru-BINAP systems. Zirconium phosphonate-based chiral porous hybrid materials containing the Ru(BINAP)(diamine)Cl_{2} precatalysts showed excellent enantioselectivity (up to 99.2% ee) in the asymmetric hydrogenation of aromatic ketones.

=== Biomimetic design and photocatalysis ===
Some MOF materials may resemble enzymes when they combine isolated polynuclear sites, dynamic host–guest responses, and hydrophobic cavity environment which are characteristics of an enzyme. Some well-known examples of cooperative catalysis involving two metal ions in biological systems include: the diiron sites in methane monooxygenase, dicopper in cytochrome c oxidase, and tricopper oxidases which have analogy with polynuclear clusters found in the 0D coordination polymers, such as binuclear Cu_{2} paddlewheel units found in MOP-1 and [Cu_{3}(btc)_{2}] (btc=benzene-1,3,5-tricarboxylate) in HKUST-1 or trinuclear units such as {Fe_{3}O(CO_{2})_{6}} in MIL-88, and IRMOP-51. Thus, 0D MOFs have accessible biomimetic catalytic centers. In enzymatic systems, protein units show "molecular recognition", high affinity for specific substrates. It seems that molecular recognition effects are limited in zeolites by the rigid zeolite structure. In contrast, dynamic features and guest-shape response make MOFs more similar to enzymes. Indeed, many hybrid frameworks contain organic parts that can rotate as a result of stimuli, such as light and heat. The porous channels in MOF structures can be used as photocatalysis sites. In photocatalysis, the use of mononuclear complexes is usually limited either because they only undergo single-electron process or from the need for high-energy irradiation. In this case, binuclear systems have a number of attractive features for the development of photocatalysts. For 0D MOF structures, polycationic nodes can act as semiconductor quantum dots which can be activated upon photostimuli with the linkers serving as photon antennae. Theoretical calculations show that MOFs are semiconductors or insulators with band gaps between 1.0 and 5.5 eV which can be altered by changing the degree of conjugation in the ligands. Experimental results show that the band gap of IRMOF-type samples can be tuned by varying the functionality of the linker. An integrated MOF nanozyme was developed for anti-inflammation therapy.

== Other applications ==
=== Electrocatalysis ===
The high surface area and atomic metal sites feature of MOFs make them a suitable candidate for electrocatalysts, especially energy-related ones. Until now, MOFs have been used extensively as electrocatalyst for water splitting (hydrogen evolution reaction and oxygen evolution reaction), carbon dioxide reduction, and oxygen reduction reaction. Currently there are two routes: 1. Using MOFs as precursors to prepare electrocatalysts with carbon support. 2. Using MOFs directly as electrocatalysts. However, some results have shown that some MOFs are not stable under electrochemical environment. The electrochemical conversion of MOFs during electrocatalysis may produce the real catalyst materials, and the MOFs are precatalysts under such conditions. Therefore, claiming MOFs as the electrocatalysts requires in situ techniques coupled with electrocatalysis.

=== Biological imaging and sensing ===
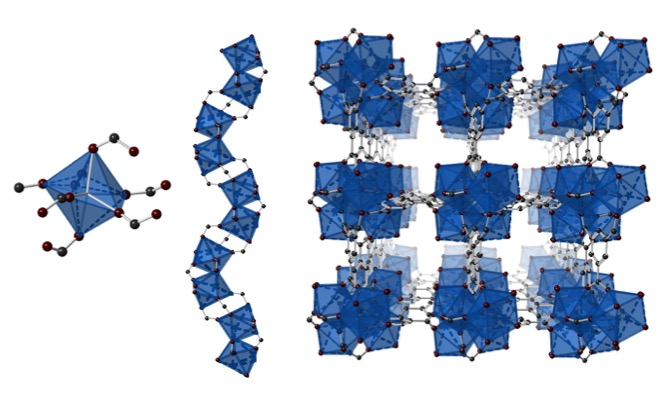
MOF-76 crystal, where oxygen, carbon, and lanthanide atoms are represented by maroon, black, and blue spheres, respectively. Includes metal node connectivity (blue polyhedra), infinite-rod SBU, and 3D representation of MOF-76.

A potential application for MOFs is biological imaging and sensing via photoluminescence. A large subset of luminescent MOFs use lanthanides in the metal clusters. Lanthanide photoluminescence has many unique properties that make them ideal for imaging applications, such as characteristically sharp and generally non-overlapping emission bands in the visible and near-infrared (NIR) regions of the spectrum, resistance to photobleaching or "blinking", and long luminescence lifetimes. However, lanthanide emissions are difficult to sensitize directly because they must undergo LaPorte forbidden f-f transitions. Indirect sensitization of lanthanide emission can be accomplished by employing the "antenna effect", where the organic linkers act as antennae and absorb the excitation energy, transfer the energy to the excited state of the lanthanide, and yield lanthanide luminescence upon relaxation. A prime example of the antenna effect is demonstrated by MOF-76, which combines trivalent lanthanide ions and 1,3,5-benzenetricarboxylate (btc) linkers to form infinite rod SBUs coordinated into a three dimensional lattice. As demonstrated by multiple research groups, the BTC linker can effectively sensitize the lanthanide emission, resulting in a MOF with variable emission wavelengths depending on the lanthanide identity. Additionally, the Yan group has shown that Eu^{3+}- and Tb^{3+}- MOF-76 can be used for selective detection of acetophenone from other volatile monoaromatic hydrocarbons. Upon acetophenone uptake, the MOF shows a sharp decrease, or quenching, of the luminescence intensity.

For use in biological imaging, however, two main obstacles must be overcome:

- MOFs must be synthesized on the nanoscale so as not to affect the target's normal interactions or behavior
- The absorbance and emission wavelengths must occur in regions with minimal overlap from sample autofluorescence, other absorbing species, and maximum tissue penetration.

Regarding the first point, nanoscale MOF (NMOF) synthesis has been mentioned in an earlier section. The latter obstacle addresses the limitation of the antenna effect. Smaller linkers tend to improve MOF stability, but have higher energy absorptions, predominantly in the ultraviolet (UV) and high-energy visible regions. A design strategy for MOFs with redshifted absorption properties has been accomplished by using large, chromophoric linkers. These linkers are often composed of polyaromatic species, leading to large pore sizes and thus decreased stability. To circumvent the use of large linkers, other methods are required to redshift the absorbance of the MOF so lower energy excitation sources can be used. Post-synthetic modification (PSM) is one promising strategy. Luo et al. introduced a new family of lanthanide MOFs with functionalized organic linkers. The MOFs, deemed MOF-1114, MOF-1115, MOF-1130, and MOF-1131, are composed of octahedral SBUs bridged by amino functionalized dicarboxylate linkers. The amino groups on the linkers served as sites for covalent PSM reactions with either salicylaldehyde or 3-hydroxynaphthalene-2-carboxaldehyde. Both of these reactions extend the π-conjugation of the linker, causing a redshift in the absorbance wavelength from 450 nm to 650 nm. The authors also propose that this technique could be adapted to similar MOF systems and, by increasing pore volumes with increasing linker lengths, larger pi-conjugated reactants can be used to further redshift the absorption wavelengths. Biological imaging using MOFs has been realized by several groups, namely Foucault-Collet and co-workers. In 2013, they synthesized a NIR-emitting Yb^{3+}-NMOF using phenylenevinylene dicarboxylate (PVDC) linkers. They observed cellular uptake in both HeLa cells and NIH-3T3 cells using confocal, visible, and NIR spectroscopy. Although low quantum yields persist in water and Hepes buffer solution, the luminescence intensity is still strong enough to image cellular uptake in both the visible and NIR regimes.

=== Nuclear wasteform materials ===
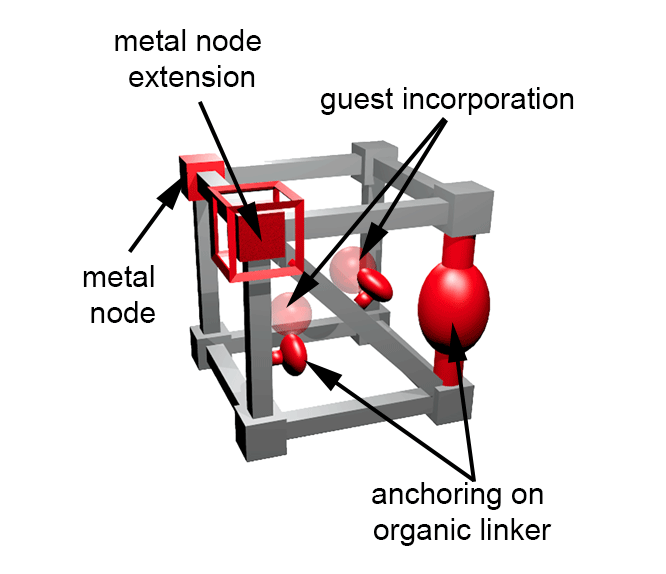
Schematic representation of different ways to incorporate actinide species inside the MOF.

With an increased public awareness and concern regarding radioactive contamination, there has been an increased interest in the development of new pathways for the capture, containment, and disposal of nuclear waste, which has largely been generated through the operation of nuclear power plants and continued decommissioning of nuclear weapons. One of the largest challenges currently recognized within the nuclear waste sector is the development and synthesis of novel materials capable of long-term containment and selective capture of actinides. Thus, metal-organic frameworks have emerged as a promising material towards this application; their remarkable modularity, high surface area, selective binding affinities, and customizable topology/crystallinity allow for a material with tunable, on-demand properties and high structural stability. These properties allow for the design of a framework that connects material properties with changes in structure at the atomic level, providing insight into the processes that these materials rely upon. For example, metal-organic frameworks tend to have high structural stability, as evidenced by their crystallinity. This has been applied towards nuclear waste by demonstrating that metal-organic frameworks, specifically a zirconium-based framework, resist prolonged exposure to gamma-rays, a deeply penetrating, hazardous form of radiation known to be emitted by radioactive substances such as 241Am, while retaining crystallinity. There are several known methods by which metal-organic frameworks have been used to sequester radionuclides. Foremost is the incorporation of radionuclides into the metal-organic framework as the metal nodes. This effectively captures the actinides by incorporating them into the rigid crystal structure itself, locking it in place. The incoperation of actinides as metal nodes can be achieved through a variety of methods, including synthesis, metal-node extension, and cation exchange. Actinide-containing metal-organic frameworks can be synthesized directly from actinide salts, allowing for direct incorporation without further or previous modification required. Additionally, the metal-node can be extended, allowing for a combination of actinides and transition metals to serve as the nodes simultaneously. Finally, actinides can be incorporated into the metal node through cation exchange; a previously-synthesized metal-organic framework is exposed to actinide cations, where the radionuclides are allowed to slowly replace the transition metal as the metal nodes, incorporating themselves into the crystal itself.

Another known method by which metal-organic frameworks capture radionuclides is through the binding/anchoring of these cations to functionalized organic linkers. These organic linkers commonly utilize nucleophilic moieties known to bind and anchor to cations; such moieties include carboxylic acid groups and crown ethers. This binding/anchoring drastically slows the rate of actinides leaching from the framework. For example, carboxylic acid-functionalized linkers have been used to drastically slow the leaching of 241Am into dimethylformamide from a zirconium-based framework. Another reported method of radionuclide capture by metal-organic frameworks is through the incorporation of guest molecules. In this method, radionuclides are locked in the crystalline pores through first introducing the actinide cations into these pores and subsequent installation of additional or capping linkers. The central concept is that once the actinides are in the crystalline structure, additional linkers hinder the actinide cations and slow the leaching process from the crystal structure. Leeching from these capped frameworks has been reported to be on a similar order of magnitude as other materials used in radionuclide containment, such as perovskites, zeolites, and phosphate ceramics.

=== Drug delivery ===
The synthesis, characterization, and drug-related studies of low toxicity, biocompatible MOFs has shown that they have potential for medical applications. Many groups have synthesized various low toxicity MOFs and have studied their uses in loading and releasing various therapeutic drugs for potential medical applications. A variety of methods exist for inducing drug release, such as pH-response, magnetic-response, ion-response, temperature-response, and pressure response.

In 2010, Smaldone et al., an international research group, synthesized a biocompatible MOF termed CD-MOF-1 from cheap edible natural products. CD-MOF-1 consists of repeating base units of 6 γ-cyclodextrin rings bound together by potassium ions. γ-cyclodextrin (γ-CD) is a symmetrical cyclic oligosaccharide that is mass-produced enzymatically from starch and consists of eight asymmetric α-1,4-linked D-glucopyranosyl residues. The molecular structure of these glucose derivatives, which approximates a truncated cone, bucket, or torus, generates a hydrophilic exterior surface and a nonpolar interior cavity. Cyclodextrins can interact with appropriately sized drug molecules to yield an inclusion complex. Smaldone's group proposed a cheap and simple synthesis of the CD-MOF-1 from natural products. They dissolved sugar (γ-cyclodextrin) and an alkali salt (KOH, KCl, potassium benzoate) in distilled bottled water and allowed 190 proof grain alcohol (Everclear) to vapor diffuse into the solution for a week. The synthesis resulted in a cubic (γ-CD)6 repeating motif with a pore size of approximately 1 nm. Subsequently, in 2017 Hartlieb et al. at Northwestern did further research with CD-MOF-1 involving the encapsulation of ibuprofen. The group studied different methods of loading the MOF with ibuprofen as well as performing related bioavailability studies on the ibuprofen-loaded MOF. They investigated two different methods of loading CD-MOF-1 with ibuprofen; crystallization using the potassium salt of ibuprofen as the alkali cation source for production of the MOF, and absorption and deprotonation of the free-acid of ibuprofen into the MOF. From there the group performed in vitro and in vivo studies to determine the applicability of CD-MOF-1 as a viable delivery method for ibuprofen and other NSAIDs. In vitro studies showed no toxicity or effect on cell viability up to 100 μM. In vivo studies in mice showed the same rapid uptake of ibuprofen as the ibuprofen potassium salt control sample with a peak plasma concentration observed within 20 minutes, and the cocrystal has the added benefit of double the half-life in blood plasma samples. The increase in half-life is due to CD-MOF-1 increasing the solubility of ibuprofen compared to the pure salt form.

Since these developments many groups have done further research into drug delivery with water-soluble, biocompatible MOFs involving common over-the-counter drugs. In March 2018 Sara Rojas and her team published their research on drug incorporation and delivery with various biocompatible MOFs other than CD-MOF-1 through simulated cutaneous administration. The group studied the loading and release of ibuprofen (hydrophobic) and aspirin (hydrophilic) in three biocompatible MOFs (MIL-100(Fe), UiO-66(Zr), and MIL-127(Fe)). Under simulated cutaneous conditions (aqueous media at 37 °C) the six different combinations of drug-loaded MOFs fulfilled "the requirements to be used as topical drug delivery systems, such as released payload between 1 and 7 days" and delivering a therapeutic concentration of the drug of choice without causing unwanted side effects. The group discovered that the drug uptake is "governed by the hydrophilic/hydrophobic balance between cargo and matrix" and "the accessibility of the drug through the framework". The "controlled release under cutaneous conditions follows different kinetics profiles depending on: (i) the structure of the framework, with either a fast delivery from the open structure MIL-100 or a slower drug release from the narrow 1D pore system of MIL-127 or (ii) the hydrophobic/hydrophilic nature of the cargo, with a fast (Aspirin) and slow (Ibuprofen) release from the UiO-66 matrix." Moreover, a simple ball milling technique is used to efficiently encapsulate the model drugs 5-fluorouracil, caffeine, para-aminobenzoic acid, and benzocaine. Both computational and experimental studies confirm the suitability of [Zn_{4}O(dmcapz)_{3}] to incorporate high loadings of the studied bioactive molecules.

Recent research involving MOFs as a drug delivery method includes more than just the encapsulation of everyday drugs like ibuprofen and aspirin. In early 2018 Chen et al., published detailing their work on the use of MOF, ZIF-8 (zeolitic imidazolate framework-8) in antitumor research "to control the release of an autophagy inhibitor, 3-methyladenine (3-MA), and prevent it from dissipating in a large quantity before reaching the target." The group performed in vitro studies and determined that "the autophagy-related proteins and autophagy flux in HeLa cells treated with 3-MA@ZIF-8 NPs show that the autophagosome formation is significantly blocked, which reveals that the pH-sensitive dissociation increases the efficiency of autophagy inhibition at the equivalent concentration of 3-MA." This shows promise for future research and applicability with MOFs as drug delivery methods in the fight against cancer.

=== Semiconductors ===
In 2014, researchers proved that they can create electrically conductive thin films of MOFs (Cu_{3}(btc)_{2} (also known as HKUST-1; BTC, benzene-1,3,5-tricarboxylic acid) infiltrated with the molecule 7,7,8,8-tetracyanoquinododimethane) that could be used in applications including photovoltaics, sensors, and electronic materials and a path toward creating semiconductors. The team demonstrated tunable, air-stable electrical conductivity with values as high as 7 siemens per meter, comparable to bronze.

Ni_{3}(2,3,6,7,10,11-hexaiminotriphenylene)_{2} was shown to be a metal-organic graphene analogue that has a natural band gap, making it a semiconductor, and is able to self-assemble. It is an example of conductive metal-organic framework. It represents a family of similar compounds. Because of the symmetry and geometry in 2,3,6,7,10,11-hexaiminotriphenylene (hitp), the overall organometallic complex has an almost fractal nature that allows it to perfectly self-organize. By contrast, graphene must be doped to give it the properties of a semiconductor. Ni_{3}(hitp)_{2} pellets had a conductivity of 2 S/cm, a record for a metal-organic compound.

In 2018, researchers synthesized a two-dimensional semiconducting MOF (Fe_{3}(THT)_{2}(NH_{4})_{3}, also known as THT, 2,3,6,7,10,11-triphenylenehexathiol) and showed high electric mobility at room temperature. In 2020 the same material was integrated in a photo-detecting device, detecting a broad wavelength range from UV to NIR (400–1575 nm). This was the first time a two-dimensional semiconducting MOF was demonstrated to be used in opto-electronic devices.

Cu_{3}(HHTP)_{2} is a 2D MOF structure, and there are limited examples of materials which are intrinsically conductive, porous, and crystalline. Layered 2D MOFs have porous crystalline structure showing electrical conductivity. These materials are constructed from trigonal linker molecules (phenylene or triphenylene) and six functional groups of –OH, -NH_{2}, or –SH. The trigonal linker molecules and square-planarly coordinated metal ions such as Cu^{2+}, Ni^{2+}, Co^{2+}, and Pt^{2+} form layers with hexagonal structures which look like graphene in larger scale. Stacking of these layers can build one-dimensional pore systems. Graphene-like 2D MOFs have shown decent conductivities. This makes them a good choice to be tested as electrode material for evolution of hydrogen from water, oxygen reduction reactions, supercapacitors, and sensing of volatile organic compounds (VOCs). Among these MOFs, Cu_{3}(HHTP)_{2} has exhibited the lowest conductivity, but also the strongest reaction in sensing of VOCs.

=== Biomimetic mineralization ===
Biomolecules can be incorporated during the MOF crystallization process. Biomolecules including proteins, DNA, and antibodies could be encapsulated within ZIF-8. Enzymes encapsulated in this way were stable and active even after being exposed to harsh conditions (e.g. aggressive solvents and high temperature). ZIF-8, MIL-88A, HKUST-1, and several luminescent MOFs containing lanthanide metals were used for the biomimetic mineralization process. In addition, individual living cells were encapsulated within MOF shells via single-cell nanoencapsulation (SCNE).

=== Water treatment ===
Metal–organic frameworks (MOFs) have attracted increasing attention as functional materials for water treatment due to their high surface area, tunable pore structures, and chemical versatility. These properties enable MOFs to act as efficient platforms for the removal of a wide range of contaminants from aqueous systems. In particular, MOFs have been extensively investigated for the adsorption of heavy metal ions such as lead, chromium, arsenic, and cadmium, as well as for the removal of organic pollutants including dyes, pesticides, and pharmaceutical residues.

In water treatment applications, adsorption is one of the primary mechanisms by which MOFs operate. The porous structure of MOFs provides abundant active sites for interaction with pollutants, while the ability to tailor the chemical functionality of the framework allows for selective binding through coordination interactions, electrostatic attraction, and hydrogen bonding. This tunability has enabled the design of MOFs with enhanced selectivity toward specific contaminants, making them promising candidates for targeted water purification.

Beyond adsorption, MOFs have also been explored in membrane-based separation processes and as catalytic materials for the degradation of pollutants. For example, MOF-based membranes have demonstrated potential for selective ion separation and removal of dissolved contaminants, while photocatalytic and advanced oxidation processes involving MOFs have been used to degrade persistent organic pollutants into less harmful species. In addition, composite materials incorporating MOFs with polymers, carbon materials, or magnetic nanoparticles have been developed to improve mechanical stability, facilitate recovery, and enhance overall treatment efficiency.

Despite these promising applications, several challenges remain for the large-scale implementation of MOFs in water treatment systems. These include limited stability in aqueous environments for certain frameworks, the cost and scalability of synthesis, and the need for improved durability under realistic operating conditions. Ongoing research efforts are therefore focused on developing more robust MOF structures and scalable production methods to enable their practical deployment in water purification technologies.

=== Desalination/ion separation ===
MOF membranes can achieve substantial ion selectivity due to their small repeating structures. This offers the potential for use in desalination and water treatment. As of 2020, reverse osmosis supplied more than two-thirds of global desalination capacity, and the last stage of most water treatment processes. Osmosis does not use dehydration of ions, or selective ion transport in biological channels and it is not energy efficient. The mining industry uses membrane-based processes to reduce water pollution, and to recover metals. MOFs could be used to extract metals such as lithium from seawater and waste streams.

MOF membranes such as ZIF-8 and UiO-66 membranes with uniform subnanometer pores consisting of angstrom-scale windows and nanometer-scale cavities displayed ultrafast selective transport of alkali metal ions. The windows acted as ion selectivity filters for alkali metal ions, while the cavities functioned as pores for transport. The ZIF-8 and UiO-66 membranes showed a LiCl/RbCl selectivity of ~4.6 and ~1.8, respectively, much higher than the 0.6 to 0.8 selectivity in traditional membranes. A 2020 study suggested that a new MOF called PSP-MIL-53 could be used along with sunlight to purify water in just half an hour.

=== Ferroelectrics and multiferroics ===
Some MOFs also exhibit spontaneous electric polarization, which occurs due to the ordering of electric dipoles (polar linkers or guest molecules) below a certain phase transition temperature. If this long-range dipolar order can be controlled by the external electric field, a MOF is called ferroelectric. Some ferroelectric MOFs also exhibit magnetic ordering making them single structural phase multiferroics. This material property is interesting for construction of memory devices with high information density. The coupling mechanism of type-I [(CH_{3})_{2}NH_{2}][Ni(HCOO)_{3}] molecular multiferroic is spontaneous elastic strain mediated indirect coupling.

=== Hydrogen storage ===
Molecular hydrogen has the highest specific energy of any fuel. However, unless the hydrogen gas is compressed, its volumetric energy density is low, so the transportation and storage of hydrogen require energy-intensive compression and liquefaction processes. Therefore, development of new hydrogen storage methods which decrease the concomitant pressure required for practical volumetric energy density is an active area of research. MOFs attract attention as materials for adsorptive hydrogen storage because of their high specific surface areas and surface to volume ratios, as well as their chemically tunable structures.

Compared to an empty gas cylinder, a MOF-filled gas cylinder can store more hydrogen at a given pressure because hydrogen molecules adsorb to the surface of MOFs. Furthermore, MOFs are free of dead-volume, so there is almost no loss of storage capacity as a result of space-blocking by non-accessible volume. Also, because the hydrogen uptake is based primarily on physisorption, many MOFs have a fully reversible uptake-and-release behavior. No large activation barriers are required when liberating the adsorbed hydrogen. The storage capacity of a MOF is limited by the liquid-phase density of hydrogen because the benefits provided by MOFs can be realized only if the hydrogen is in its gaseous state.

The extent to which a gas can adsorb to a MOF's surface depends on the temperature and pressure of the gas. In general, adsorption increases with decreasing temperature and increasing pressure (until a maximum is reached, typically 20–30 bar, after which the adsorption capacity decreases). However, MOFs to be used for hydrogen storage in automotive fuel cells need to operate efficiently at ambient temperature and pressures between 1 and 100 bar, as these are the values that are deemed safe for automotive applications.

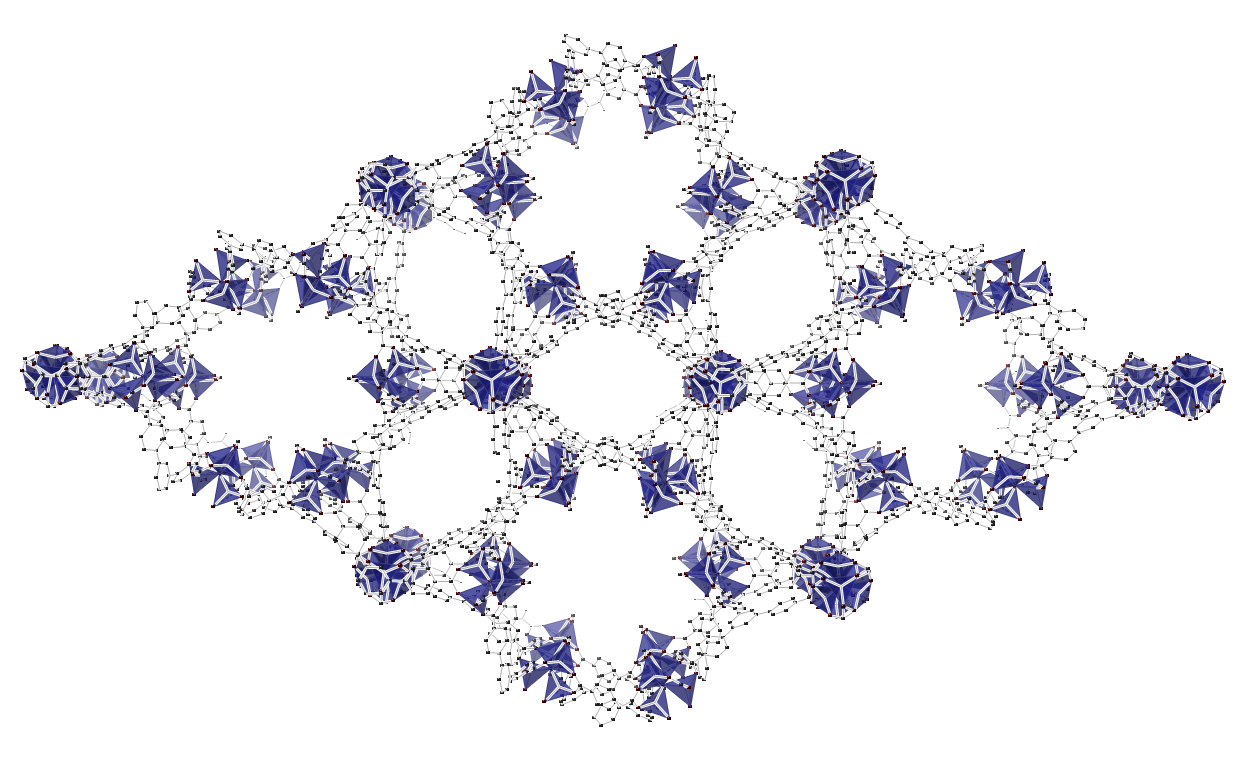
MOF-177

The U.S. Department of Energy (DOE) has published a list of yearly technical system targets for on-board hydrogen storage for light-duty fuel cell vehicles which guide researchers in the field (5.5 wt %/40 g L^{−1} by 2017; 7.5 wt %/70 g L^{−1} ultimate). Materials with high porosity and high surface area such as MOFs have been designed and synthesized in an effort to meet these targets. These adsorptive materials generally work via physical adsorption rather than chemisorption due to the large HOMO–LUMO gap and low HOMO energy level of molecular hydrogen. A benchmark material to this end is MOF-177 which was found to store hydrogen at 7.5 wt % with a volumetric capacity of 32 g L^{−1} at 77 K and 70 bar. MOF-177 consists of [Zn_{4}O]^{6+} clusters interconnected by 1,3,5-benzenetribenzoate organic linkers and has a measured BET surface area of 4630 m^{2} g^{−1}. Another exemplary material is PCN-61 which exhibits a hydrogen uptake of 6.24 wt % and 42.5 g L^{−1} at 35 bar and 77 K and 2.25 wt % at atmospheric pressure. PCN-61 consists of [Cu_{2}]^{4+} paddle-wheel units connected through 5,5′,5′′-benzene-1,3,5-triyltris(1-ethynyl-2-isophthalate) organic linkers and has a measured BET surface area of 3000 m^{2} g^{−1}. Despite these promising MOF examples, the classes of synthetic porous materials with the highest performance for practical hydrogen storage are activated carbon and covalent organic frameworks (COFs).

==== Design principles ====
Practical applications of MOFs for hydrogen storage are met with several challenges. For hydrogen adsorption near room temperature, the hydrogen binding energy would need to be increased considerably. Several classes of MOFs have been explored, including carboxylate-based MOFs, heterocyclic azolate-based MOFs, metal-cyanide MOFs, and covalent organic frameworks. Carboxylate-based MOFs have by far received the most attention because

- They are either commercially available or easily synthesized,
- They have high acidity (pK_{a} ~ 4) allowing for facile in situ deprotonation,
- The metal-carboxylate bond formation is reversible, facilitating the formation of well-ordered crystalline MOFs, and
- The bridging bidentate coordination ability of carboxylate groups favors the high degree of framework connectivity and strong metal-ligand bonds necessary to maintain MOF architecture under the conditions required to evacuate the solvent from the pores.

The most common transition metals employed in carboxylate-based frameworks are Cu^{2+} and Zn^{2+}. Lighter main-group metal ions have also been explored. Be_{12}(OH)_{12}(btb)_{4}, the first successfully synthesized and structurally characterized MOF consisting of a light main group metal ion, shows high hydrogen storage capacity, but it is too toxic to be employed practically. There is considerable effort being put forth in developing MOFs composed of other light main group metal ions, such as magnesium in Mg_{4}(bdc)_{3}.

The following is a list of several MOFs that are considered to have the best properties for hydrogen storage as of May 2012 (in order of decreasing hydrogen storage capacity). While each MOF described has its advantages, none of these MOFs reach all of the standards set by the U.S. DOE. Therefore, it is not yet known whether materials with high surface areas, small pores, or di- or trivalent metal clusters produce the most favorable MOFs for hydrogen storage.

MOFs that are considered to have the best properties for hydrogen storage as of May 2012
Name	Formula	Structure	Hydrogen storage capacity	Comments
MOF-210	Zn_{4}O(BTE)(BPDC), where BTE^{3−}=4,4′,4″-[benzene-1,3,5-triyl-tris(ethyne-2,1-diyl)]tribenzoate and BPDC^{2−}=biphenyl-4,4′-dicarboxylate		At 77 K: 8.6 excess wt% (17.6 total wt%) at 77 K and 80 bar. 44 total g H_{2}/L at 80 bar and 77 K. At 298 K: 2.90 delivery wt% (1–100 bar) at 298 K and 100 bar.	
MOF-200	Zn_{4}O(BBC)_{2}, where BBC^{3−}=4,4′,4″-[benzene-1,3,5-triyl-tris(benzene-4,1-diyl)]tribenzoate		At 77 K: 7.4 excess wt% (16.3 total wt%) at 77 K and 80 bar. 36 total g H_{2}/L at 80 bar and 77 K. At 298 K: 3.24 delivery wt% (1–100 bar) at 298 K and 100 bar.	
MOF-177	Zn_{4}O(BTB)_{2}, where BTB^{3−}=1,3,5-benzenetribenzoate	Tetrahedral [Zn_{4}O]^{6+} units are linked by large, triangular tricarboxylate ligands. Six diamond-shaped channels (upper) with diameter of 10.8 Å surround a pore containing eclipsed BTB^{3−} moieties (lower).	7.1 wt% at 77 K and 40 bar; 11.4 wt% at 78 bar and 77 K.	MOF-177 has larger pores, so hydrogen is compressed within holes rather than adsorbed to the surface. This leads to higher total gravimetric uptake but lower volumetric storage density compared to MOF-5.
MOF-5	Zn_{4}O(BDC)_{3}, where BDC^{2−}=1,4-benzenedicarboxylate	Square openings are either 13.8 or 9.2 Å depending on the orientation of the aromatic rings.	7.1 wt% at 77 K and 40 bar; 10 wt% at 100 bar; volumetric storage density of 66 g/L.	MOF-5 has received much attention from theorists because of the partial charges on the MOF surface, which provide a means of strengthening the binding hydrogen through dipole-induced intermolecular interactions; however, MOF-5 has poor performance at room temperature (9.1 g/L at 100 bar).
	Mn_{3}[(Mn_{4}Cl)_{3}(BTT)_{8}]_{2}, where H_{3}BTT=benzene-1,3,5-tris(1H-tetrazole)	Consists of truncated octahedral cages that share square faces, leading to pores of about 10 Å in diameter. Contains open Mn^{2+} coordination sites.	60 g/L at 77 K and 90 bar; 12.1 g/L at 90 bar and 298 K.	This MOF is the first demonstration of open metal coordination sites increasing strength of hydrogen adsorption, which results in improved performance at 298 K. It has relatively strong metal-hydrogen interactions, attributed to a spin state change upon binding or to a classical Coulombic attraction.
	Cu_{3}(BTC)_{2}(H_{2}O)_{3}, where H_{3}BTC=1,3,5-benzenetricarboxylic acid	Consists of octahedral cages that share paddlewheel units to define pores of about 9.8 Å in diameter.		High hydrogen uptake is attributed to overlapping attractive potentials from multiple copper paddle-wheel units: each Cu(II) center can potentially lose a terminal solvent ligand bound in the axial position, providing an open coordination site for hydrogen binding.

==== Structural impacts on hydrogen storage capacity ====
To date, hydrogen storage in MOFs at room temperature is a battle between maximizing storage capacity and maintaining reasonable desorption rates, while conserving the integrity of the adsorbent framework (e.g., completely evacuating pores, preserving the MOF structure, etc.) over many cycles. There are two major strategies governing the design of MOFs for hydrogen storage:

- To increase the theoretical storage capacity of the material, and
- To bring the operating conditions closer to ambient temperature and pressure. Rowsell and Yaghi have identified several directions to these ends in some of the early papers.

===== Surface area =====
The general trend in MOFs used for hydrogen storage is that the greater the surface area, the more hydrogen the MOF can store. High surface area materials tend to exhibit increased micropore volume and inherently low bulk density, allowing for more hydrogen adsorption to occur.

===== Hydrogen adsorption enthalpy =====
High hydrogen adsorption enthalpy is also important. Theoretical studies have shown that 22–25 kJ/mol interactions are ideal for hydrogen storage at room temperature, as they are strong enough to adsorb H_{2}, but weak enough to allow for quick desorption. The interaction between hydrogen and uncharged organic linkers is not this strong, and so a considerable amount of work has gone in synthesis of MOFs with exposed metal sites, to which hydrogen adsorbs with an enthalpy of 5–10 kJ/mol. Synthetically, this may be achieved by using ligands whose geometries prevent the metal from being fully coordinated, by removing volatile metal-bound solvent molecules over the course of synthesis, and by post-synthetic impregnation with additional metal cations. (C_{5}H_{5})V(CO)_{3}(H_{2}) and Mo(CO)_{5}(H_{2}) are great examples of increased binding energy due to open metal coordination sites; however, their high metal-hydrogen bond dissociation energies result in a tremendous release of heat upon loading with hydrogen, which is not favorable for fuel cells. MOFs, therefore, should avoid orbital interactions that lead to such strong metal-hydrogen bonds and employ simple charge-induced dipole interactions, as demonstrated in Mn_{3}[(Mn_{4}Cl)_{3}(btt)_{8}]_{2}.

An association energy of 22–25 kJ/mol is typical of charge-induced dipole interactions, and so there is interest in the use of charged linkers and metals. The metal–hydrogen bond strength is diminished in MOFs, probably due to charge diffusion, so 2+ and 3+ metal ions are being studied to strengthen this interaction even further. A problem with this approach is that MOFs with exposed metal surfaces have lower concentrations of linkers; this makes them difficult to synthesize, as they are prone to framework collapse. This may diminish their useful lifetimes as well.

===== Sensitivity to airborne moisture =====
MOFs are frequently sensitive to moisture in the air. In particular, IRMOF-1 degrades in the presence of small amounts of water at room temperature. Studies on metal analogues have unraveled the ability of metals other than Zn to stand higher water concentrations at high temperatures.

To compensate for this, specially constructed storage containers are required, which can be costly. Strong metal-ligand bonds, such as in metal-imidazolate, -triazolate, and -pyrazolate frameworks, are known to decrease a MOF's sensitivity to air, reducing the expense of storage.

===== Pore size =====
In a microporous material where physisorption and weak van der Waals forces dominate adsorption, the storage density is greatly dependent on the size of the pores. Calculations of idealized homogeneous materials, such as graphitic carbons and carbon nanotubes, predict that a microporous material with 7 Å-wide pores will exhibit maximum hydrogen uptake at room temperature. At this width, exactly two layers of hydrogen molecules adsorb on opposing surfaces with no space left in between. 10 Å-wide pores are also of ideal size because at this width, exactly three layers of hydrogen can exist with no space in between. (A hydrogen molecule has a bond length of 0.74 Å with a van der Waals radius of 1.17 Å for each atom; therefore, its effective van der Waals length is 3.08 Å.)

===== Structural defects =====
Structural defects also play an important role in the performance of MOFs. Room-temperature hydrogen uptake via bridged spillover is mainly governed by structural defects, which can have two effects:

- A partially collapsed framework can block access to pores; thereby reducing hydrogen uptake, and
- Lattice defects can create an intricate array of new pores and channels causing increased hydrogen uptake.

Structural defects can also leave metal-containing nodes incompletely coordinated. This enhances the performance of MOFs used for hydrogen storage by increasing the number of accessible metal centers. Finally, structural defects can affect the transport of phonons, which affects the thermal conductivity of the MOF.

==== Hydrogen adsorption ====
Adsorption is the process of trapping atoms or molecules that are incident on a surface; therefore the adsorption capacity of a material increases with its surface area. In three dimensions, the maximum surface area will be obtained by a structure which is porous, such that atoms and molecules can access internal surfaces. This simple qualitative argument suggests that the porous metal-organic frameworks (MOFs) should be excellent candidates for hydrogen storage devices.

Adsorption can be broadly classified as being one of two types: physisorption or chemisorption. Physisorption is characterized by weak van der Waals interactions, and bond enthalpies typically less than 20 kJ/mol. Chemisorption, alternatively, is defined by stronger covalent and ionic bonds, with bond enthalpies between 250 and 500 kJ/mol. In both cases, the adsorbate atoms or molecules (i.e. the particles which adhere to the surface) are attracted to the adsorbent (solid) surface because of the surface energy that results from unoccupied bonding locations at the surface. The degree of orbital overlap then determines if the interactions will be physisorptive or chemisorptive.

Adsorption of molecular hydrogen in MOFs is physisorptive. Since molecular hydrogen only has two electrons, dispersion forces are weak, typically 4–7 kJ/mol, and are only sufficient for adsorption at temperatures below 298 K.

A complete explanation of the H_{2} sorption mechanism in MOFs was achieved by statistical averaging in the grand canonical ensemble, exploring a wide range of pressures and temperatures.

==== Determining hydrogen storage capacity ====
Two hydrogen-uptake measurement methods are used for the characterization of MOFs as hydrogen storage materials: gravimetric and volumetric. To obtain the total amount of hydrogen in the MOF, both the amount of hydrogen absorbed on its surface and the amount of hydrogen residing in its pores should be considered. To calculate the absolute absorbed amount (N_{abs}), the surface excess amount (N_{ex}) is added to the product of the bulk density of hydrogen (ρ_{bulk}) and the pore volume of the MOF (V_{pore}), as shown in the following equation:

$N_{\rm abs}=N_{\rm ex} + \rho_{\rm bulk} V_{\rm pore}$

===== Gravimetric method =====
The increased mass of the MOF due to the stored hydrogen is directly calculated by a sensitive microbalance. Due to buoyancy, the detected mass of adsorbed hydrogen decreases again when a sufficiently high pressure is applied to the system because the density of the surrounding gaseous hydrogen becomes more and more important at higher pressures. Thus, this "weight loss" has to be corrected using the volume of the MOF's frame and the density of hydrogen.

===== Volumetric method =====
The changing of amount of hydrogen stored in the MOF is measured by detecting the varied pressure of hydrogen at constant volume. The volume of adsorbed hydrogen in the MOF is then calculated by subtracting the volume of hydrogen in free space from the total volume of dosed hydrogen.

==== Other methods of hydrogen storage ====
There are six possible methods that can be used for the reversible storage of hydrogen with a high volumetric and gravimetric density, which are summarized in the following table, (where ρ_{m} is the gravimetric density, ρ_{v} is the volumetric density, T is the working temperature, and P is the working pressure):

Storage method	ρ_{m} (mass%)	ρ_{v} (kg H_{2}/m^{3})	T (°C)	P (bar)	Remarks
High-pressure gas cylinders	13	<40	25	800	Compressed H_{2} gas in lightweight composite cylinder
Liquid hydrogen in cryogenic tanks	size-dependent	70.8	−252	1	Liquid H_{2}; continuous loss of a few percent of H_{2} per day at 25 °C
Adsorbed hydrogen	~2	20	−80	100	Physisorption of H_{2} on materials
Adsorbed on interstitial sites in a host metal	~2	150	25	1	Atomic hydrogen reversibly adsorbs in host metals
Complex compounds	<18	150	>100	1	Complex compounds ([AlH_{4}]^{−} or [BH_{4}]^{−}); desorption at elevated temperature, adsorption at high pressures
Metal and complexes together with water	<40	>150	25	1	Chemical oxidation of metals with water and liberation of H_{2}

Of these, high-pressure gas cylinders and liquid hydrogen in cryogenic tanks are the least practical ways to store hydrogen for the purpose of fuel due to the high pressure required for storing hydrogen gas or the low temperature required for storing hydrogen liquid. The other methods are all being studied and developed extensively.

=== Analytical chemistry and sample preparation ===
Metal–organic frameworks have been investigated as selective sorbent phases for analytical sample preparation, including solid-phase extraction and solid-phase microextraction (SPME). Their pore dimensions, organic linkers, and surface functional groups can be modified to control molecular accessibility, interfacial polarity, and interactions such as hydrogen bonding, hydrophobic partitioning, and π–π interactions. This allows MOFs to isolate and concentrate selected analytes from complex samples before chromatographic or spectrometric detection.

Zirconium-based UiO frameworks have been engineered by varying the linker length, functional-group chemistry, and proportion of amino-functionalized linkers. A mixed-linker UiO-67-NH_{2} material was incorporated into an electrospun polyacrylonitrile coating on an SPME Arrow and coupled with high-performance liquid chromatography with ultraviolet detection. The system was used to determine five structurally related estrogenic contaminants—bisphenol A, p-tert-butylphenol, 4-pentylphenol, nonylphenol, and hexestrol—in milk and pork. The extraction coating retained stable performance over 200 extraction–desorption cycles.

=== Future directions ===
Over the last three decades, MOFs have been greatly refined and utilized in a wide range of applications. It has been speculated that the integration of artificial intelligence tools into MOF research could lead to the discovery of applications with the potential to solve modern energy and environmental challenges, though currently no public research exists to back this speculation.

== Mechanical properties ==
Implementing MOFs in industry necessitates a thorough understanding of the mechanical properties since most processing techniques (e.g., extrusion and pelletization) expose the MOFs to substantial mechanical compressive stresses. The mechanical response of porous structures is of interest as these structures can exhibit unusual response to high pressures. While zeolites (microporous, aluminosilicate minerals) can give some insights into the mechanical response of MOFs, the presence of organic linkers as opposed to zeolites, makes for novel mechanical responses. MOFs are structurally diverse meaning that it is challenging to classify all of their mechanical properties. Additionally, variability in MOFs from batch to batch and extreme experimental conditions (diamond anvil cells) mean that experimental determination of mechanical response to loading is limited, however many computational models have been made to determine structure-property relationships. Main MOF systems that have been explored are zeolitic imidazolate frameworks (ZIFs), Carboxylate MOFs, Zirconium-based MOFs, among others. Generally, the MOFs undergo three processes under compressive loading (which is relevant in a processing context): amorphization, hyperfilling, and/or pressure induced phase transitions. During amorphization linkers buckle and the internal porosity within the MOF collapses. During hyperfilling the MOF which is being hydrostatically compressed in a liquid (typically solvent) will expand rather than contract due to a filling of pores with the loading media. Finally, pressure induced phase transitions where the structure of the crystal is altered during the loading are possible. The response of the MOF is predominantly dependent on the linker species and the inorganic nodes. However, certain MOFs exhibit guest-dependent crystal polymorphism, where different guest molecules can induce distinct crystal phases or configurations. This phenomenon results in MOF crystal structures that change depending on the composition of the surrounding gaseous environment.

=== Zeolitic imidazolate frameworks (ZIFs) ===
Several different mechanical phenomena have been observed in zeolitic imidazolate frameworks (ZIFs), the most widely studied MOF for mechanical properties due to their many similarities to zeolites. General trends for the ZIF family are the tendency of the Young's modulus and hardness of the ZIFs to decrease as the accessible pore volume increases. The bulk moduli of ZIF-62 series increase with the increasing of benzoimidazolate (bim^{−}) concentration. ZIF-62 shows a continuous phase transition from open pore (op) to close pore (cp) phase when bim^{−} concentration is over 0.35 per formular unit. The accessible pore size and volume of ZIF-62-bim_{0.35} can be precisely tuned by applying adequate pressures. Another study has shown that under hydrostatic loading in solvent the ZIF-8 material expands as opposed to contracting. This is a result of hyperfilling of the internal pores with solvent. A computational study demonstrated that ZIF-4 and ZIF-8 materials undergo a shear softening mechanism with amorphizing (at ~ 0.34 GPa) of the material under hydrostatic loading, while still possessing a bulk modulus on the order of 6.5 GPa. Additionally, the ZIF-4 and ZIF-8 MOFs are subject to many pressure dependent phase transitions.

=== Carboxylate-based MOFs ===
Carboxylate MOFs come in many forms and have been widely studied. Herein, HKUST-1, MOF-5, and the MIL series are discussed as representative examples of the carboxylate MOF class.

==== HKUST-1 ====
HKUST-1 consists of a dimeric Cu-paddlewheel that possesses two pore types. Under pelletization MOFs such as HKUST-1 exhibit a pore collapse. Although most carboxylate MOFs have a negative thermal expansion (they densify during heating), it was found that the hardness and Young's moduli unexpectedly decrease with increasing temperature from disordering of linkers. It was also found computationally that a more mesoporous structure has a lower bulk modulus. However, an increased bulk modulus was observed in systems with a few large mesopores versus many small mesopores even though both pore size distributions had the same total pore volume. The HKUST-1 shows a similar, "hyperfilling" phenomenon to the ZIF structures under hydrostatic loading.

==== MOF-5 ====
MOF-5 has tetranuclear nodes in an octahedral configuration with an overall cubic structure. MOF-5 has a compressibility and Young's modulus (~14.9 GPa) comparable to wood, which was confirmed with density functional theory (DFT) and nanoindentation. While it was shown that the MOF-5 can demonstrate the hyperfilling phenomenon within a loading media of solvent, these MOFs are sensitive to pressure and undergo amorphization/pressure induced pore collapse at a pressure of 3.5 MPa when there is no fluid in the pores.

==== MIL-53 ====
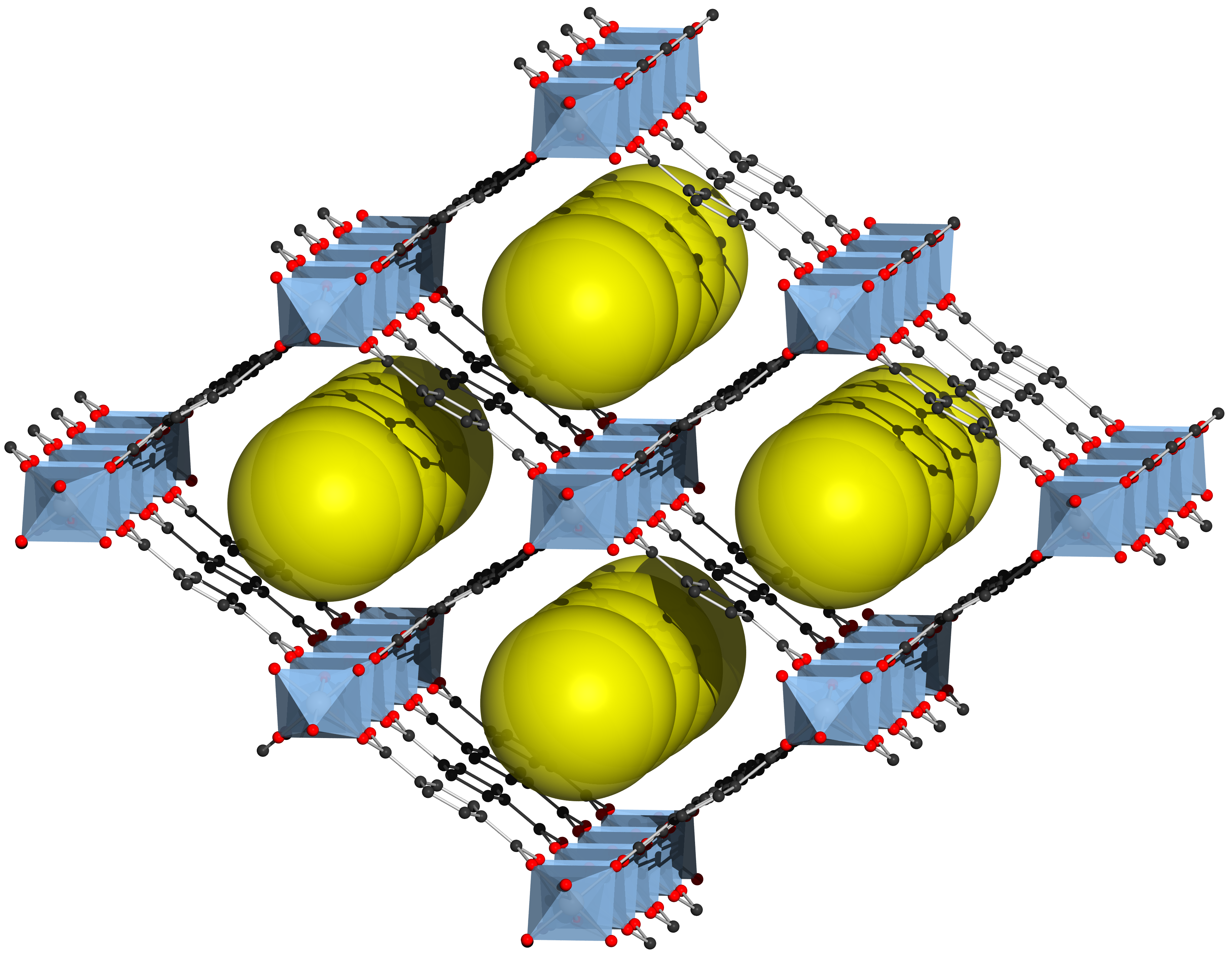
MIL-53 MOF wine rack structure illustrating potential for anisotropy in loading

MIL-53 MOFs possess a "wine rack" structure. These MOFs have been explored for anisotropy in Young's modulus due to the flexibility of loading, and the potential for negative linear compressibility when compressing in one direction, due to the ability of the wine rack opening during loading.

=== Zirconium-based MOFs ===
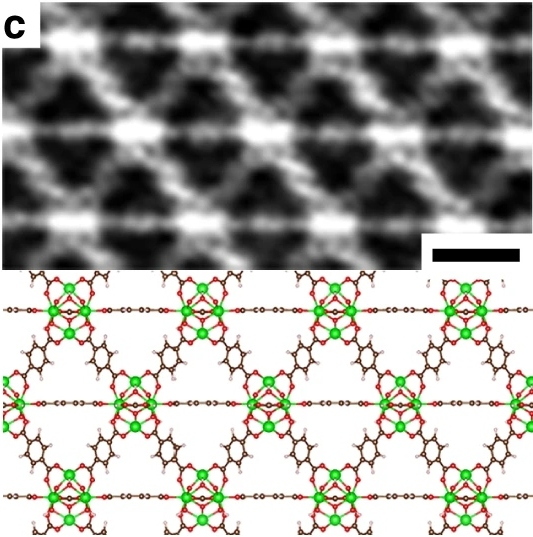
Electron micrograph and structure of UiO-66. Color codes: red – oxygen, brown – carbon, green – zirconium, gray – hydrogen.

Zirconium-based MOFs such as UiO-66 are a robust class of MOFs (attributed to strong hexanuclear Zr_{6} metallic nodes) with increased resistance to heat, solvents, and other harsh conditions, which makes them of interest in terms of mechanical properties. Determinations of shear modulus and pelletization have shown that the UiO-66 MOFs are mechanically robust and have high tolerance for pore collapse when compared to ZIFs and carboxylate MOFs. Although the UiO-66 MOF shows increased stability under pelletization, the UiO-66 MOFs amorphized fairly rapidly under ball milling conditions due to destruction of linker coordinating inorganic nodes.

== Composite materials ==
Another approach to increasing adsorption in MOFs is to alter the system in such a way that chemisorption becomes possible. This functionality has been introduced by making a composite material, which contains a MOF and a complex of platinum with activated carbon. In an effect known as hydrogen spillover, H_{2} can bind to the platinum surface through a dissociative mechanism which cleaves the hydrogen molecule into two hydrogen atoms and enables them to travel down the activated carbon onto the surface of the MOF. This innovation produced a threefold increase in the room-temperature storage capacity of a MOF; however, desorption can take upwards of 12 hours, and reversible desorption is sometimes observed for only two cycles. The relationship between hydrogen spillover and hydrogen storage properties in MOFs is not well understood but may prove relevant to hydrogen storage.

== See also ==
- BET theory – Theory for physical adsorption of gas molecules on a solid surface
- Conjugated microporous polymer – Type of porous material
- Cryogenics – Study of the production and behaviour of materials at very low temperatures
- Crystal nets (periodic graphs)
- Flexible metal-organic framework – Material that responds to stimuli
- Gérard Férey – French chemist
- Hydrogen economy – Using hydrogen to decarbonize more sectors
- Hydrogen-bonded organic framework
- Macromolecular assembly – Large chemical complexes composed of polymers and other macromolecules
- Metal–inorganic framework – Inorganic counterpart to MOFs
- Organometallic chemistry – Study of organic compounds containing metal(s)
- Solid sorbents for carbon capture – Materials that absorb carbon dioxide
- United States Department of Energy – U.S. government department regulating energy production and nuclear material handling
- X-ray Crystallography – Technique used for determining crystal structures and identifying mineral compounds
- Zeolitic imidazolate frameworks – Class of metal–organic frameworks
