= Metal–inorganic framework =

Inorganic counterpart to MOFs

Metal–inorganic frameworks (MIFs) are a class of compounds consisting of metal ions or clusters coordinated to inorganic ligands to form one-, two-, or three-dimensional structures. They are a subclass of coordination polymers, with the special feature that they are often porous. They are inorganic counterpart of Metal–organic frameworks.

== History ==
Millon's base which have been known since early 20th century, can be considered as MIFs.

== Linkers ==
MIF with Borazocine linker was developed for hydrogen storage. Cu2I2Se6 has Se6 linkers. There are many MIFs with pnictogen linkers.
