= Tetrapyrazinoporphyrazine =

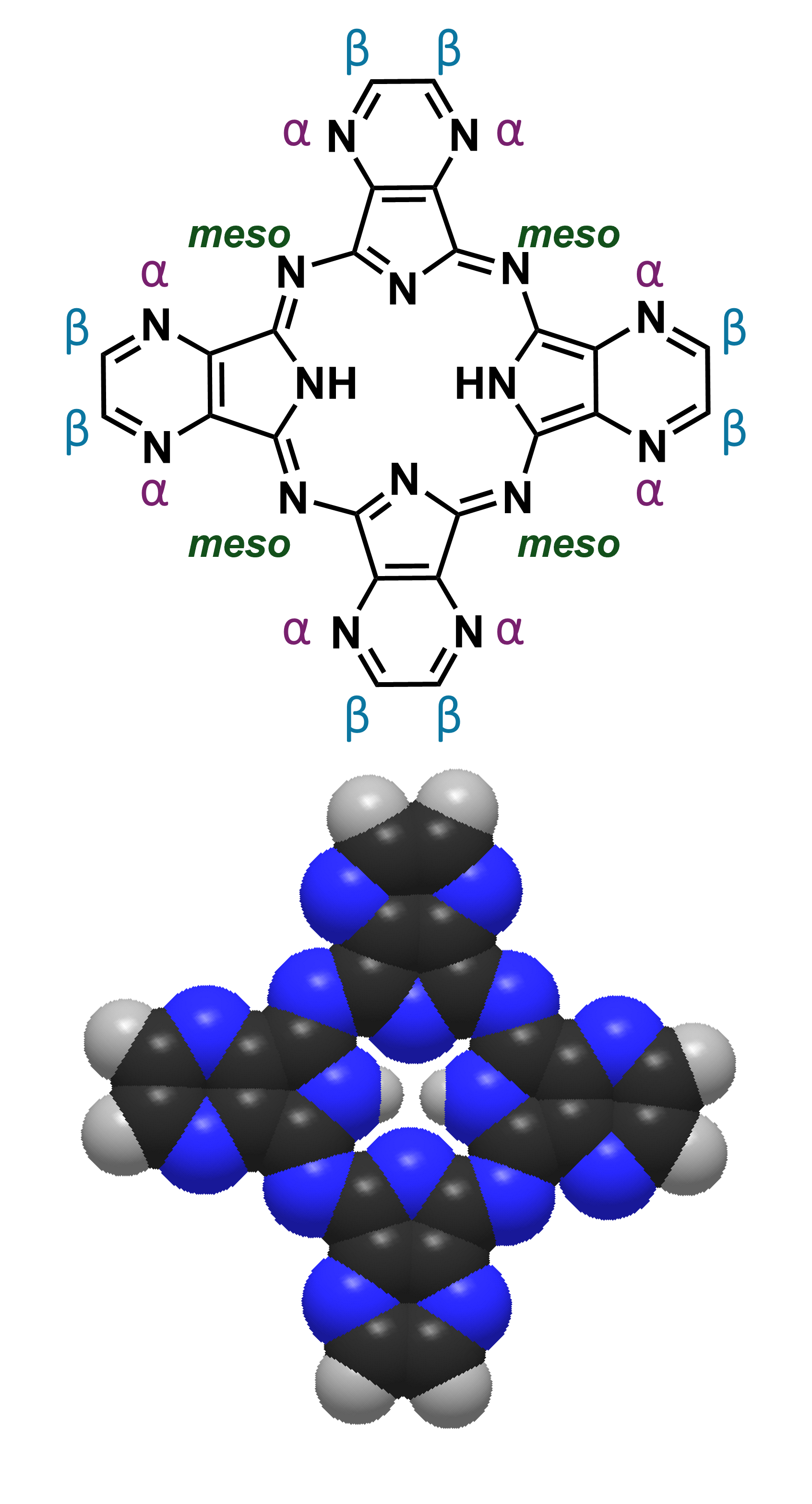
- Structure and space-filling model of tetrapyrazinoporphyrazine (TPz). Color code: black is carbon, blue is nitrogen, grey is hydrogen.

Identifiers
CAS Number	7233-73-0
3D model (JSmol)	Interactive image
ChemSpider	10563680
PubChem CID	135692606
- InChI: InChI=1S/C24H10N16/c1-2-26-10-9(25-1)17-33-18(10)38-20-13-14(30-6-5-29-13)22(35-20)40-24-16-15(31-7-8-32-16)23(36-24)39-21-12-11(19(34-21)37-17)27-3-4-28-12/h1-8H,(H2,33,34,35,36,37,38,39,40); Key: DUDMGGZESXBABL-UHFFFAOYSA-N
- SMILES: C1=CN=C2C(=N1)C3=NC4=C5N=CC=NC5=C(N4)N=C6C7=NC=CN=C7C(=N6)N=C8C9=NC=CN=C9C(=N8)N=C2N3

Properties
Chemical formula	C_{24}H_{10}N_{16}
Molar mass	522.456 g·mol^{−1}

Related compounds
Related compounds	phthalocyanine
- Except where otherwise noted, data are given for materials in their standard state (at 25 °C [77 °F], 100 kPa). Infobox references

Tetrapyrazinoporphyrazine (TPz or TPyzPz), also known as azaphthalocyanine (AzaPc), is a planar, aromatic, macrocyclic, organic compound that is viewed as an aza-analogue of phthalocyanine (Pc). It was first discovered and reported in 1937 by R. P. Linstead, the scientist who was able to configure the structures of porphyrazines and phthalocyanines as well. The structure of TPz is similar to that of Pc with eight nitrogen atoms substituting the carbons at the α-positions.

== Electronic and optical properties of TPz ==
Similar to its analogues, the central core of TPz can be present as a free base (2H), which yields a D_{2h} symmetry molecule, or metalated, in general, with a first-row transition metal ion (M) to yield a molecule with D_{4h} symmetry.

TPz molecules possess characteristic UV-Vis absorption spectra, observed as Soret bands (also known as B-bands) and Q-bands, similar to their analogous macrocycles. These bands result from the extended aromatic π-conjugation, allowing TPz molecules to absorb in the visible region. In the range of 620-720 nm, an intense and narrow Q-band is observed, whereas a less intense and broader B-band is observed at around 350 nm, both of which are attributed to be resulting from π-π* transitions. For metalated cores that are generally more symmetrical with D_{4h} symmetry, only one band is observed in the Q-band region of UV-Vis, whereas the less symmetrical D_{2h} non-metalated cores show two peaks in that region. The location of wavelength maxima in these spectra greatly depends on the electron-donating or withdrawing nature of the peripheral substituents, which can shift the peak positions bathochromically or hypsochromically depending on their electron-withdrawing or donating properties.

TPz molecules possess both acidic and basic properties depending on the type of solvents they are dissolved in. Upon protonation in acidic conditions, both azomethine nitrogen atoms within the porphyrazine core as well as the pyrazine nitrogen atoms at the α-positions of TPz can get protonated. In basic conditions, however, central pyrrole nitrogen atoms of non-metalated cores are deprotonated into H_{2}TPz^{•-} or H_{2}TPz^{2-}, with the acidity of these protons depending heavily on the peripheral substituents attached to the TPz molecule.

== Comparison of TPz to related compounds ==
Structurally, TPz is related to other well-known macrocycles formed of tetrapyrrole subunits, such as porphyrin, porphyrazine, and phthalocyanine. Due to the negative inductive effect of the eight extra electron-withdrawing nitrogen atoms in the TPz structure, TPz molecules show greater electron deficiency than Pc analogous structures. Additionally, TPz molecules generally manifest increased intramolecular charge transport, lower reduction potentials, enhanced conductivity, but less effective π-conjugated systems.

Free-base TPz molecules possess similar optical, magnetic, and structural properties to these analogues when each is reduced to its anionic states: radical anion (H_{2}TPz^{•-}) or dianion (H_{2}TPz^{2-}), yet with higher stability, allowing more air-stable functional compounds based on anionic TPz. This enhanced stability results from the more positive reduction potentials of TPz derivatives upon their aza-substitution compared to the reduction potentials of their Pc-based analogs.

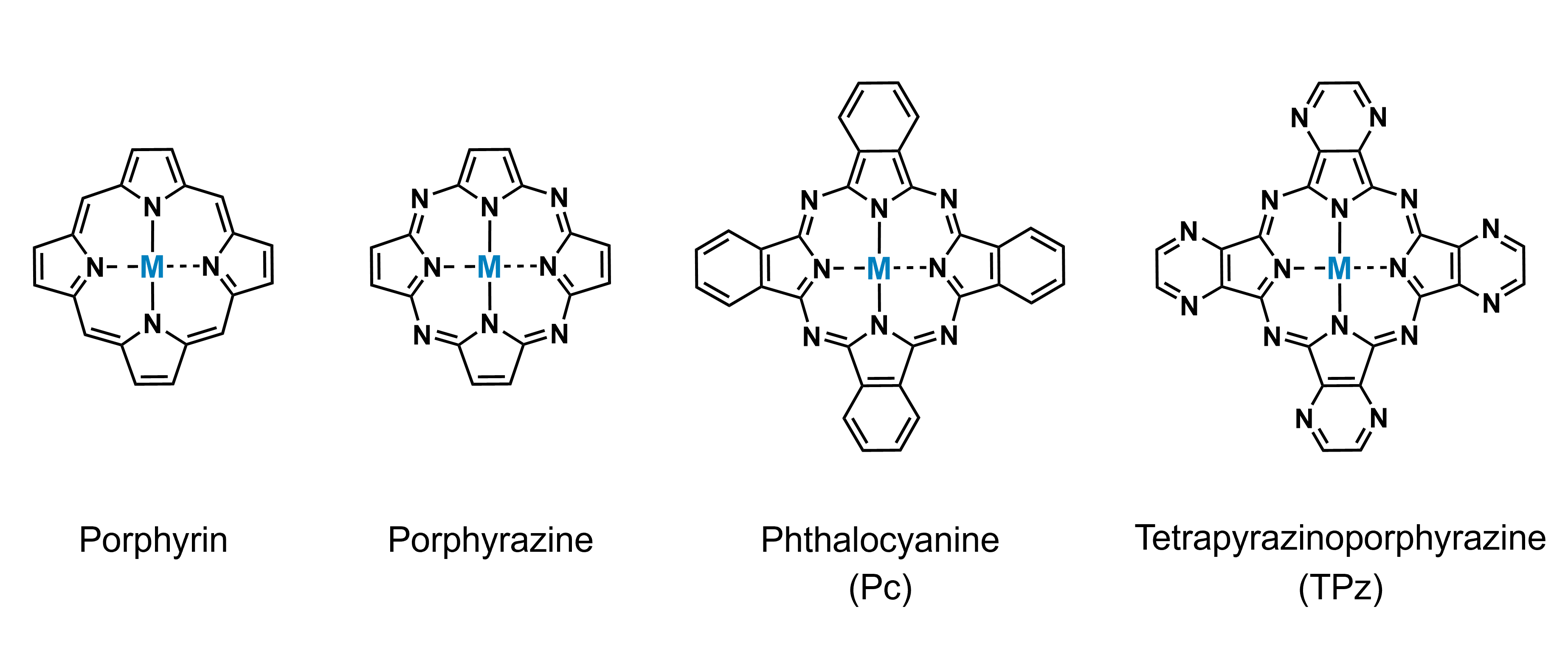
Structural analogs of tetrapyrazinoporphyrazine, where M = 2H or metal ion.

Upon increasing the number of aza-substitutions of the Pc macrocycle, the HOMO–LUMO gap as well as the excitation energies increase, as shown through both cyclic voltammetry (CV) experimental studies and density functional theory (DFT) theoretical calculations. This increase is also confirmed through a shift to higher energy of the Q-band maximum wavelength position of upon isosteric aza-substitution. In addition, TPz derivatives often show possess strong fluorescence band in the visible region, permitting their use as red fluorophores, unlike most Pc derivatives whose fluorescence bands appear in the near-infrared region and are thus not within the visible region.

Other similar characteristics between these analogues include poor solubility of the unsubstituted core in various solvents, which limits their utilization in different applications. Thus, researchers have resorted into adding substituents that can provide both: enhanced solubility and additional functionalization sites. Some studies have reported the synthesis of Pc and TPz derivatives that are even water-soluble, like the example in which click chemistry was utilized to add polyethylene glycol (PEG) functionalities as periphery substituents, rendering them soluble in aqueous media as well as organic solvents.

== Synthesis ==
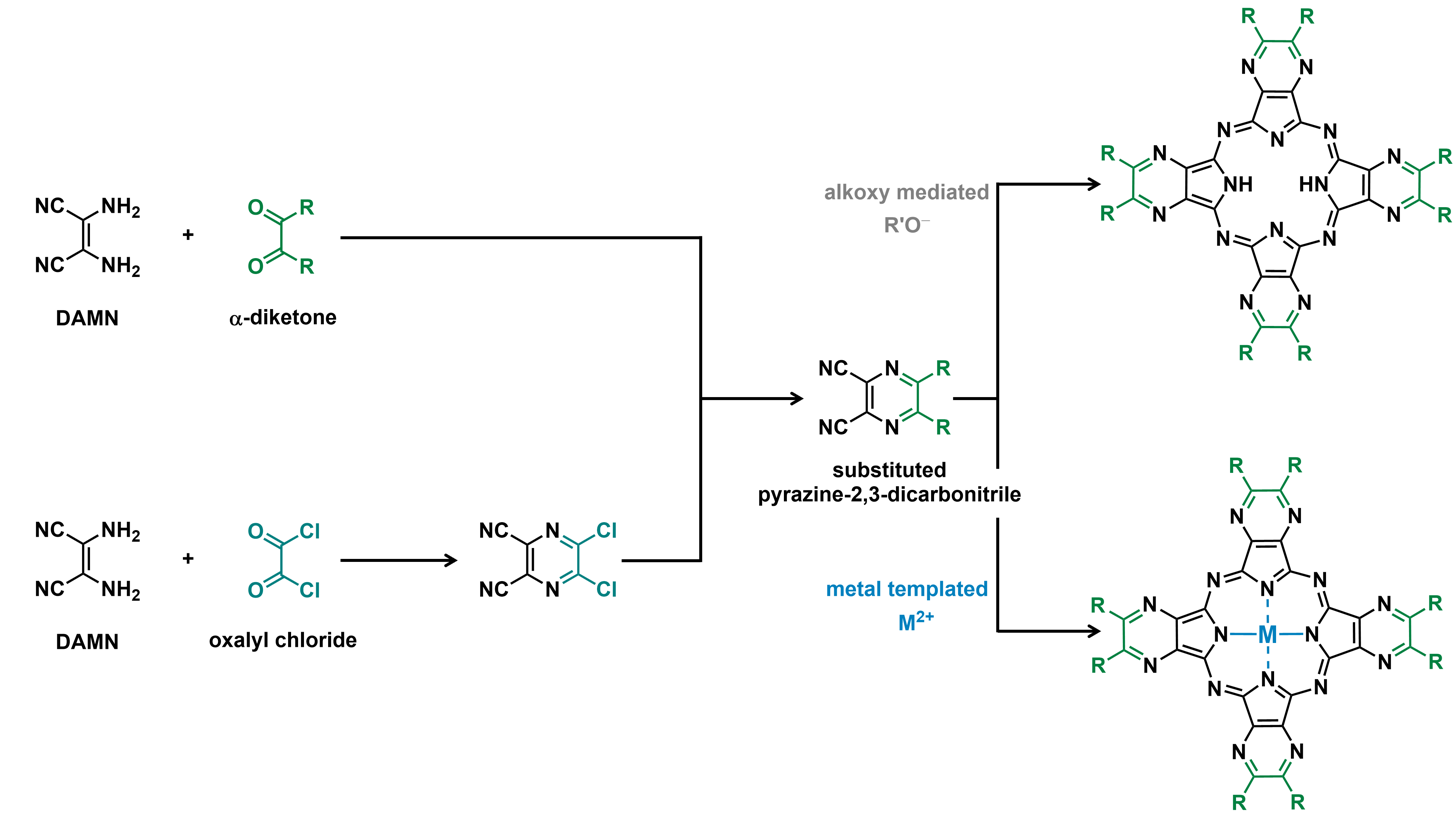
Typical synthetic protocols of TPz and its building blocks, where R = functionalized or non-functionalized alkyl, aryl, or heteroaryl substituents.

TPzs are usually synthesized upon the cyclotetramerization of pyrazine-2,3-dicarbonitriles, which itself can be synthesized either from the condensation of diaminomaleonitrile (DAMN) and substituted α-diketone derivatives or from the substitution of chloro pyrazine-2,3-dicarbonitriles. To achieve TPz synthesis, pyrazine-2,3-dicarbonitriles can be reacted either through alkoxide-initiation using lithium butoxide or through templated cyclization pathways by adding a metal ion template. Greatly electron-deficient macrocycle formation reactions, as is the case of TPz, require the use of templated method by utilizing a cyclotetramerization agent to avoid the risk of alkoxide initiator exchanging the positions of peripheral substituents. Often, a mild cyclotetramerization agent is utilized to accompany the metal ion template, such as magnesium butoxide, to attain the MgTPz macrocycle.

The magnesium-templated cyclotetramerization reaction can be followed by a central metal removal to attain non-metalated core or a metal center exchange reaction to replace the central metal with a transition metal. This option is particularly advantageous since Mg^{2+} ions are easily demetalated form the central TPz core in acidic conditions.

^{1}H-NMR (Nuclear Magnetic Resonance) spectroscopy can be utilized to characterize TPz molecules and their derivatives. Yet, it is critical to find a suitable solvent in which the TPz derivative is soluble. ^{1}H-NMR peaks arising from TPz derivatives can appear for i) peripheral substituents attached to the -positions of TPz, or ii) from central core protons for the non-metalated counterparts which appear at around -0.5 to -1.3 ppm (lower field shifted compared to those of metal-free Pc derivatives that appear at around -3 to -5 ppm).

== Potential Applications ==
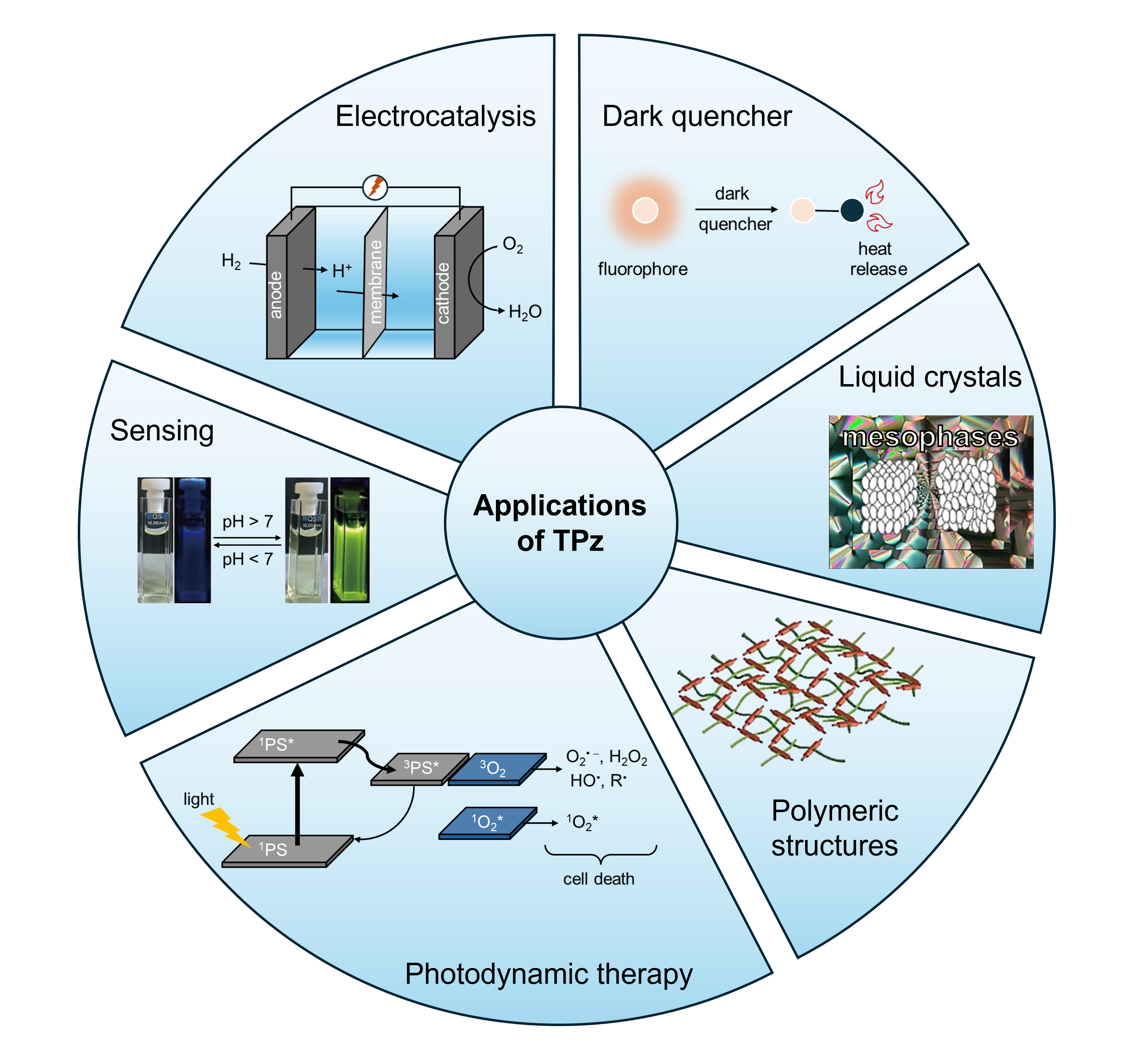
Applications of TPz

TPz molecules have been utilized in a variety of applications, including photodynamic therapy, pH sensing, fluorescence quenching, and electrocatalysis, owing to their unique optical and electronic properties.

=== Photodynamic therapy (PDT) ===
Similar to its porphyrin analogues, TPz molecules have potential as drugs for PDT cancer treatments. For example, researchers reported a TPz derivative as a promising PDT/BNCT (boron neutron capture therapy) candidate, in which TPz molecule with pyridyl substituents, where the nitrogen atoms of the latter were coordinated to a palladium carboran-1-thiolate complex. Another study reported the incorporation of bulky triazole-phenoxy substituents with a specific orientation, which was key for the enhanced photodynamic activity of the molecules. Other efforts have focused on providing water-soluble molecules or incorporating different metal centers within the TPz for developing enhanced photosensitizer (PS). For example, anionic carboxylate peripheral substituents on TPz inhibited their aggregation in aqueous media and showed promising photodynamic activity through in vitro studies. In addition, a silicon-centered TPz derivative was encapsulated into a spherically shaped shell formed of carbohydrate-based block co-polymeric micelles, and the composite was shown to provide promising PDT applications with excellent photostability and selectivity towards cancerous cells.

=== Electrocatalysis ===
The efficiency of oxygen reduction reaction (ORR) electrocatalysis by TPz derivatives is highly dependent on the type of central metal as well as the peripheral substituents attached to its β-positions. A study showed that unsubstituted Cu or Co-TPz showed enhanced ORR catalysis performance, particularly activity, durability, and product selectivity, compared to substituted derivatives. Another study has integrated cobalt-metalated aza-substituted Pc analogues, namely CoPc, cobalt tetrapyridinoporphyrazine (CoTPP), and CoTPz, onto carbon nanotubes (CNTs) and studied the effect of this substitution on the ORR electrocatalysis. Results showed that CoTPP and CoTPz provide enhanced ORR activity in comparison to CoPc, attributed to the one-step four-electron ORR process for the former analogues versus the two-step two-electron pathway for the latter.

=== Sensing ===
By adding substituents, composed of various functional groups, to the β-positions of TPz, specific host–guest interactions can be targeted to cause fluorescence amplification or quenching upon the interaction of TPz (host) with metal ions (guest), which allows for sensing the presence of these ions. For instance, zinc-centered TPz molecules with aza-crown ether substituents were synthesized and were able to selectively sense the presence of potassium thiocyanate (KSCN) through the size-fit recognition of the K^{+} cation and the coordination of SCN^{−} to the zinc cation in lab-controlled solvent systems as well as in in vitro biological systems. Alternatively, another study demonstrated the synthesis of a fluorescence quenching asymmetric dipyridyl-containing TPz sensor in the presence Cu^{2+} ions.

In addition, due to the basic and acidic nature of TPz, its derivatives show promising applications in pH sensing, depending on the peripheral substituents attached to the core. Particularly, attaching nitrogen donor (N-donor) sites can allow sensing of basic media, while including donor phenolate (O-donor) sites provides molecules that are able to sense acidic media. In addition to the latter, free-base TPz can cause an increase in fluorescence upon the deprotonation of its central nitrogen atoms in basic media. By comparing the different observations of previously reported structure-property relationships, a researcher can withdraw generalizable features of structural effects on fluorescence. Thus, by choosing different substituent features that might cause changes in fluorescence, by selecting to synthesize a metal-free of metal-centered TPz, and/or by altering the peripheral functional groups, it is possible to design a TPz molecule that can utilize these features to allow a synergistic effect observed as increase or decrease in fluorescence intensity of the molecule at different pH values.

=== Dark quenchers ===
TPz molecules have also been reported as efficient dark quenchers. TPz molecules have been proven to be efficient as labels for oligonucleotides, which were able to quench the fluorescence of fluorescein amidite (FAM) and invitrogen cyanine5 (Cy5) dyes in DNA hybridization probes. Another unsymmetric TPz molecule but modified with oligodeoxyribonucletoides was developed as a dark quencher to these two dyes among others.

=== Liquid crystals ===
TPz molecules have the potential of showing liquid crystalline mesophase through different aspects. First, helical liquid-crystalline phases or induced chiral nematic phases can be generated by introducing chiral macroheterocyclic dopants, such as TPz, into an orientationally ordered matrix. Consequently, the efficiency of phase transitions is determined to be related to the molecular structure and volume, optical activity, and acoplanarity of the dopant. Second, by adding long aliphatic chains to the peripheries of rigid aromatic TPz molecules, there is a potential of their utilization as discotic liquid crystals. Researchers have utilized both metalated and non-metalated TPz cores with lengthy peripheral alkyl chains either by attaching them directly to the TPz core, or by extending the core aromaticity through fused aromatic rings and attaching the alkyl chains to the extended structure.

=== Integration into polymeric structures or hybrid composites ===
Since 2022, interests have been emerging into incorporating TPz structures into extended polymeric structures for functional applications. In 2022, a study reported the cyclotetramerization of a tetracarbonitrile-functionalized pyrazino pyrene molecule into a highly crystalline fused aromatic network (FAN) encompassing TPz units. It was utilized as a solid electrolyte in a proton-exchange membrane fuel cell owing to its high proton conduction. In a later study, researchers developed a three dimensional (3D) FAN based on the introduction of bulky substituents on TPz, bending its aromatic structure to become saddle-like. The synthesis of these 3D FANs was attained by the metal-templated cyclotetramerization of alkyl substituted tetracyanodihydrodipyrazinopyrazine. In 2025, these building blocks were integrated into conductive metal−organic frameworks, where they were tied together via bis(dioxolene) linkers and a linking metal node.
