= Conductive metal−organic frameworks =

Conductive metal–organic frameworks (cMOFs) are multifunctional nanomaterials composed of organic linkers interconnected by metallic nodes that exhibit efficient charge transport pathways. The first conductive MOF, Cu[Cu(2,3-pyrazinedithiol)_{2}] was described in 2009 by Takaishi and coworkers with the first two-dimensional (2D) analogs first reported by Hmadeh and coworkers in 2012. The 2D nature of these materials have been developed over the years by interchanging heteroatomic linkages, heteroatoms within the organic linkers, and building off molecular building blocks. Orbital overlap within the intra- and inter- plane regions of the frameworks allow for electrical transduction through band and redox-hopping charge transport. This electrical transduction can be taken advantage of for applications in electrochemical sensors, electrocatalysis, energy storage, spintronics, and more.

== Design and Structure ==
Figure 1: a. Various reported cMOF organic linkers. b. Graphical representations of the architecture of each organic linker with representations of their influence on basal plane structure.

MOFs are made from organic linker tied together with linking metal ions. cMOFs utilize planar, aromatic organic linker moieties allowing for self-assembly into 2D sheets that stack on top of each other via van der Waals (vdW), non-covalent interactions (Figure 1).

In 2012, the first reported 2D cMOF analogs were synthesized by Hmadeh and coworkers where they reported three analogs of 2D cMOFs designed from hexahydroxytriphenylene (HHTP) organic linkers with Cobalt (II), Nickel (II), and Copper (II) linking metal ions. Different heteroatomic linkage atoms, including amino and thiol functional groups, further gave structural diversity to these materials.

The design of these materials progressed with the publication of perthiolated coronene (PTC)-based frameworks in 2018 by Dong and coworkers, metallophthalocyanine (MPc)-based frameworks in 2018 by Jia and coworkers, truxene-based frameworks in 2020 by Zhao and coworkers, hexaamino-triphenyleno trisbenzodioxin (HAOTP)-based frameworks in 2023 by Zhang and coworkers, and tetrapyrazinoporphyrazine (TPz)-based frameworks in 2025 by Chan and coworkers. These unique architectures, combined with unique bonding arrangements dependent on metal linkages, influence the overall stacking order of these materials. Furthermore, molecular engineering of specific frameworks can enhance properties giving them an edge over others for specific applications.

== Electrical Conductivity ==
Figure 2:Graphical representations of different charge transport pathways including a. through-bond/extended conjugation, b. through-space, c. redox-hopping, and d. guest-promoted.

The majority of 2D cMOFs are considered semiconductors with a select few being metallic in nature. Within this class of semiconductor, there are different charge transport pathways including through-bond, extended conjugation, through-space, redox hopping, and guest-promoted transport (Figure 2). Through-bond, extended conjugation, and through-space are accessed by the overlapping of d and π orbital within the basal plane and the interlayer plane. Redox hopping occurs with movement of electrons between well-separated redox states via self-exchange reactions. Guest-promoted involves incorporating electroactive guest molecules into the cMOF pores which contribute to the conductivity of the material.

Researchers can measure the conductivity of a sample by directly measuring the resistivity via methods including the two-contact, four-contact, four-point probe, and Van der Pauw methods. The two-contact method involves applying a voltage and measuring the resistivity between the same two connections. The four-contact and four-point probe methods involve passing a voltage between a pair of outer connections and measuring the resistivity between a pair of inner connections. The configuration of the four-contact and four-point probe methods decrease the amount of point contact resistance is inherent to the two-contact method allowing for more accurate measurements. Finally, the Van der Pauw method is a four-contact method that has an altered arrangement for non-uniform sample shapes.

== Synthesis ==
=== Solvothermal Synthesis ===
Solvothermal synthesis traditionally involves heating a reaction higher than the solvents boiling point under high pressure in an autoclave. That being said, cMOFs are often stated as to be prepared via solvothermal synthetic routes while being at ambient pressure. This involves bulk power production via an organic and aqueous reaction mixture. Furthermore, cMOF reactions often include base activation or acidic modulation; overall, this attempts to control the rate of nucleation to allow these framework materials to self-assemble into their crystalline forms.

=== Hydrothermal Synthesis ===
Hydrothermal synthesis involves the high-pressure, high-temperature conditions of solvothermal synthesis in completely aqueous media. The first reported 2D cMOF report included the hydrothermal synthesis of the included HHTP-based materials with the organic linker, metal salt, and ammonia added to an aqueous reaction.

=== Liquid-liquid Interfacial Synthesis ===
Liquid-liquid interfacial synthesis involves the self-assembly or polymerization of materials that occur at the liquid-liquid surface of an organic and aqueous solvent system which takes advantage of the solubility difference between the organic linkers and metal salts. This synthetic technique can be used to precisely form 2D nanosheets and have been showed to work for 2D cMOFs. In 2013, Kambe and coworkers synthesis a nickel bis(dithiolene) framework using this technique.

Figure 3: Graphical representations of deposition methods for cMOFs on textiles including: dipping method, b. LbL method, and c. solvothermal method.

=== Deposition of cMOFs on Textiles ===
Multifunctional smart membranes of cMOFs on textiles can be created by dip coating, solvothermal, and layer-by-layer (LbL) deposition methods (Figure 3). Dip coating involves the dipping of a textile into a solution containing cMOF particles. This technique was first described by Chen and coworkers in 2019. Solvothermal deposition includes the inclusion of a textile within a traditional solvothermal cMOF reaction. The first report of this technique was done by Smith and coworkers. LbL deposition includes the sequential dipping of textile piece in a metal salt solution, wash solution, organic linker solution, and wash solution. Damacet and coworkers were the first to demonstrate this technique in the fabrication of cMOF coated electronic textiles in 2025.

== Potential applications ==
=== Electrochemical Sensors ===
cMOFs have been employed as chemiresistive sensors due to their unique design and structure coupled with inherent charge transports. The fabrication of devices is often accomplished by using the materials to bridge gaps between electrodes and measuring the change in resistance upon interaction with outside analytes. Campbell et al. demonstrated the function of cMOFs in chemiresistors in 2015 using copper HHTP and copper/nickel hexaiminotriphenylene (HITP) frameworks, to sense and differentiate between various volatile organic compound (VOCs). Further investigation of these material-analyte interactions have been studied allowing researchers to understand the mechanism behind the chemistry at play, with large emphasis on the surface interactions compared to migration into the pores of the material. Adjacent studies have indicated the effect of particle morphology of Cu-HHTP on chemiresistive performance, with higher surface-to-volume ratio leading to an increase in their sensing response to SO_{2}.

=== Electrocatalysis ===
Researchers have explored cMOFs within electrocatalytic systems due to their customizable structures, high surface areas, high electron mobility, and conductive nature. One of the first examples of a cMOF being employed within as an electrocatalyst was performed by Miner and coworkers in 2016, where they used Ni_{3}(HITP)_{2} to catalyze the electrochemical reduction of oxygen. Further investigations look to advance the performance of these materials with a focus on deeper comprehension of surface analyte interactions and improving the electrical conduction of the materials as a whole.

=== Energy Storage ===
Due to their structural characteristics leading to enhanced electronic conduction and charge carrier mobility, as described in previous sections, cMOFs have been employed within energy storage applications including batteries and capacitors. cMOFs have been used as cathode or anode materials, due to their transport abilities, in batteries including lithium, zinc, potassium, and sodium ion batteries. Integration of these materials look to solve problems including poor diffusion kinetics, side reactions which degrade the battery, and deposition of metals upon charging. Furthermore, their use in capacitors are motivated by an increase in structural integrity, electrical conductivity, and surface area compared to traditional electrode materials including activated carbon, metal oxides, and conducting polymers.

== Specific Families of cMOFs ==
=== Metallophthalocyanine-based cMOFs ===
Within 2D cMOFs, MPc-based materials encompass bimetallic moieties due to the incorporation of MPc building blocks within the organic linking moieties. MPc-based cMOFs were first reported in 2018 by Jia and coworkers, where they synthesized a nickel-centered, nickel-linked MPc material as a water oxidation catalyst. From there, multiple groups have reported MPc materials decorated with metals including cobalt, copper, and zinc. Taking advantage of the combined properties of MPc building blocks and cMOFs, these materials have been used in applications including chemiresistive sensing, electrocatalysis, energy storage, magnetic devices. Meng and coworkers reported the first employment of MPc frameworks for chemiresistive sensing in 2019, where they used NiPc-O-Cu and NiPc-O-Ni for the sensing of toxic gases including NH_{3}, H_{2}S, and NO. Zhong and coworkers, in 2019, first applied MPc cMOFs for the electrochemical oxygen reduction using CuPc-O-Co. The integration of MPc materials, including CuPc-O-Cu, into lithium ion batteries as the cathode was reported by Nagatomi and coworkers in 2017. Experimental integration of MPc-based cMOFs in magnetic devices was reported by Song and coworkers in 2024, where they integrated NiPc-O-Cu, CuPc-O-Cu, and H_{2}Pc-O-Cu films to produce organic spin values and negative magnetoresistance.

== See also ==
- Metal−organic framework
- Covalent−organic framework
- Coordination polymer
- Sensor
