= Sergey Varfolomeev (biochemist) =

Russian biochemist (born 1945)

Sergey Dmitrievich Varfolomeev (Russian: Сергей Дмитриевич Варфоломеев) (born 17 August 1945) is a Soviet and Russian chemist and biochemist, a specialist in physical chemistry and chemical enzymology. Doctor of Science in Chemistry (1979), Professor (since 1982), Corresponding Member of the Russian Academy of Sciences (since 2006). His research includes the molecular foundations of biocatalysts, biochemical kinetics, bioelectrocatalysis, and biosensor technologies. He has taught for many years at the Faculty of Chemistry of Moscow State University (MSU).

== Early life ==
Sergey Varfolomeev was born in Kurgan, USSR in 1945. Both of his parents were chemical engineers. He graduated from the Faculty of Chemistry at Lomonosov Moscow State University (MSU) in 1968. He completed his PhD in 1971 on light-regulated enzymatic catalysis, and in 1979 defended his doctoral dissertation on bioelectrocatalysis. He was awarded the title of Professor in 1982.

Throughout his career, Varfolomeev has held a number of scientific and administrative positions:

- Head of the Department of Biokinetics at the A. N. Belozersky Institute of Physical and Chemical Biology, MSU (1979–2001);
- Head of the Department of Chemical Enzymology at the Faculty of Chemistry, MSU (1987-2019);
- Director of the N. M. Emanuel Institute of Biochemical Physics of the Russian Academy of Sciences (RAS) (2004–2015);
- Scientific director of the RAS (2015-)
- Director of the Institute of Physicochemical foundations of Neuronal Network Functioning and Artificial Intelligence, MSU (2019-)

He was elected Corresponding Member of the RAS in May 2006.

== Scientific work ==
Varfolomeev’s scientific contributions are in the fields of biochemical kinetics, enzymatic catalysis, and the physical chemistry of biological processes. His main research directions include:

- Molecular mechanisms of enzyme action, including hydrogenases, copper-containing oxidases, prostaglandin synthases, and lipoxygenases; studies of regulatory mechanisms, physiologically active compounds, and drug effects on enzyme activity.
- Bioelectrocatalysis, involving electron transfer in enzymatic and multi-enzyme systems, and the development of applied technologies such as biosensors and enzyme immobilization strategies.
- Kinetic modeling of biochemical processes, including neuronal synapse kinetics, nanoparticle synthesis, and heterogeneous catalysis involving biomolecules.

== Educational and academic activities ==
At the MSU Faculty of Chemistry, Varfolomeev held lectures on biochemical engineering, chemical enzymology, and kinetics of biochemical processes. As the head of a department and institute director, he played a significant role in developing research programs and training specialists in bioorganic chemistry and biophysical chemistry.

== Recognition ==
Varfolomeev was awarded several major prizes and honours, including the USSR State Prize (1984), the Lenin Komsomol Prize (1974), and the Lomonosov Prize, First Degree (2000). In 2024, he was awarded the Medal of the Order “For Merit to the Fatherland”, Second Class.

== Selected publications ==
Varfolomeev has contributed to a significant number of publications, including 12 monographs, 42 patents and over 700 academic articles, covering:

- Research series on bioelectrocatalysis and enzyme kinetics.
- Monographs and textbooks on enzymatic catalysis and biotechnology.

== Contribution to science ==
Sergey Varfolomeev is regarded as one of Russia’s leading specialists in the physical chemistry of enzymatic processes and biochemical kinetics. His work has significantly advanced the understanding of enzymatic catalysis and contributed to the development of modern biosensor and biocatalytic technologies.
