= Black Hole Quencher 1 =

Names
- IUPAC name 2-[N-(2-hydroxyethyl)-4-[[2-methoxy-5-methyl-4-[(4-methyl-2-nitrophenyl)diazenyl]phenyl]diazenyl]anilino]ethanol
- Other names BHQ1; BHQ-1

Identifiers
CAS Number	374591-92-1
3D model (JSmol)	Interactive image
ChemSpider	8453672
PubChem CID	10278195
CompTox Dashboard (EPA)	DTXSID901038601
- InChI: InChI=1S/C25H28N6O5/c1-17-4-9-21(24(14-17)31(34)35)27-28-22-16-25(36-3)23(15-18(22)2)29-26-19-5-7-20(8-6-19)30(10-12-32)11-13-33/h4-9,14-16,32-33H,10-13H2,1-3H3 Key: HIASSCPHCQBUHH-UHFFFAOYSA-N
- SMILES: O=N(=O)C1=CC(=CC=C1N=NC=2C=C(OC)C(N=NC3=CC=C(C=C3)N(CCO)CCO)=CC2C)C

Properties
Chemical formula	C_{25}H_{28}N_{6}O_{5}
Molar mass	492.536 g·mol^{−1}
- Except where otherwise noted, data are given for materials in their standard state (at 25 °C [77 °F], 100 kPa). Infobox references

Black Hole Quencher 1 (BHQ1) is an example of dark quencher, which is used to quench green and yellow dyes, such as 6-carboxyfluorescein (6-FAM), tetrachlorofluorescein (TET), and hexachlorofluorescein (HEX). The role of quenchers is to absorb energy from a fluorophore and to re-emit the energy in the form of either heat (dark quenchers) or visible light (fluorescent quenchers). The absorption range of BHQ1 is from 480 to 580 nm with maximum absorption at 534 nm.
