= Electrochemical promotion of catalysis =

The electrochemical promotion of catalysis (EPOC) effect in the realm of chemistry refers to the pronounced enhancement of catalytic reactions or significant changes in the catalytic properties of a conductive catalyst in the presence of electrical currents or interfacial potentials. Also known as Non-faradaic electrochemical modification of catalytic activity (the NEMCA effect), it can increase in catalytic activity (up to 90-fold) and selectivity of a gas exposed electrode on a solid electrolyte cell upon application of a potential. This phenomenon is well documented and has been observed on various surfaces (Ni, Au, Pt, Pd, IrO_{2}, RuO_{2}) supported by O^{2−}, Na^{+} and proton conducting solid electrolytes.

The EPOC effect can also be utilized in a reverse manner in order to influence the selectivity of versatile heterogeneous catalytic reactions. In most cases, the electronically conductive catalyst is in metallic or metal oxide states in the form of a porous film deposited on a solid electrolyte (O^{2−} or mixed O^{2−} electronic conductor). The EPOC effect was firstly discovered by M. Stoukides and C. Vayenas in the early 1980s and has been widely studied by various research groups for more than 100 heterogeneous catalytic reactions of mostly gaseous molecules. The EPOC effect has been evaluated as an important phenomenon which can closely link electrocatalysis and thermal catalysis.

== Examples and research fields ==
The EPOC effect can be observed in a wide range of catalytic reactions with several kinds of metal or metal oxide catalysts mostly coupled with solid electrolytes. Versatile catalytic reactions including hydrogenations, dehydrogenations, oxidations, reductions, isomerizations, and chemical decompositions have been known to be promoted electrochemically on various transition metal and oxide catalysts (e.g., Pt, Pd, Rh, Ag, Au, Ni, Cu, Fe, IrO_{2}, RuO_{2}) deposited on O^{2−} (YSZ), Na^{+} or K^{+}, H^{+}, F^{−}, aqueous, CeO_{2} conductors, and molten salts. The main focus and purpose of numerous studies regarding the EPOC effect have been reported so far can be classified as follows: 1) the elucidation of examples for the EPOC effects on specific catalytic reactions with environmental or industrial interest (ex. NOx reduction and hydrocarbons oxidations), 2) the mechanistic investigation of the origin of the EPOC effects (mainly focusing on the system with oxygen-ion conducting electrolytes), 3) the large-scale application and commercialization of the chemical reactions promoted by the EPOC effects along with development of novel compact monolithic reactors and 4) the utilization and incorporation of the EPOC effect in high or low-temperature fuel cell systems.

== Mechanistic origins ==
Earlier mechanistic proposals for the EPOC phenomenon with solid electrolytes mainly emphasized tuning of the local work function of the surface of conductive catalysts by spilled-over species, which are in-situ generated during electrochemical polarization processes. It has been proposed that the spilled-over species can subsequently modulate the chemisorption strength between surface adsorbates (intermediates) and catalyst binding sites, thereby influencing the rate or selectivity of the target reactions significantly. Particularly in the case of oxygen-ion conducting electrolyte systems, for instance, the migrated anionic O species from the solid electrolyte to the metal-gas interface has been suggested as the origin of the corresponding EPOC effects along with the evidence that the migrated charged species on the surface can be identified via in-situ spectroscopic methods. On the other hand, the hypothesis of modification of the local work function to explain the origin of EPOC was recently criticized with a different view that heterogeneous catalysis needs to be explained by more recent concepts such as d-band center theory, rather than the surface work function, which might play a more trivial role in understanding of surface reactions.

== Aqueous electrolyte solution at ambient temperatures ==
In contrast to solid electrolyte systems under high temperatures (usually higher than 200 °C), EPOC has rarely been reported in low-temperature aqueous systems (particularly at room temperature). Only a few examples have been demonstrated for the EPOC in an aqueous electrolyte solution at ambient temperature: H_{2} oxidation at Pt catalyst surface in alkaline solutions, hydrocarbon isomerization reaction occurring at the nanoparticulate Pt catalyst, hydrazine oxidation operating at the Ni alloy catalyst in alkaline media, and CO_{2} reduction at the Pd-based gas diffusion electrode. Even though the perturbation of the local work function and tuning of surface binding strengths of intermediate species were suggested as the origin for the EPOC effects in the liquid electrolyte systems as similar to the EPOC examples of high-temperature solid electrolyte systems, thorough theoretical studies supported by clear experimental evidence have not been addressed. Very recently, it was additionally hypothesized for the cases of the hydrazine oxidation and the CO_{2} reduction that the mechanistic origin of the EPOC phenomena observed in these cases can be attributed to structurally non-disparate transition states and/or surface bound intermediate species for the corresponding bifurcated faradaic and non-faradaic reactions.

== See also ==
- Heterogeneous catalysis
- Electrocatalyst
