= Hexahydroxytriphenylene =

Group of chemical compounds

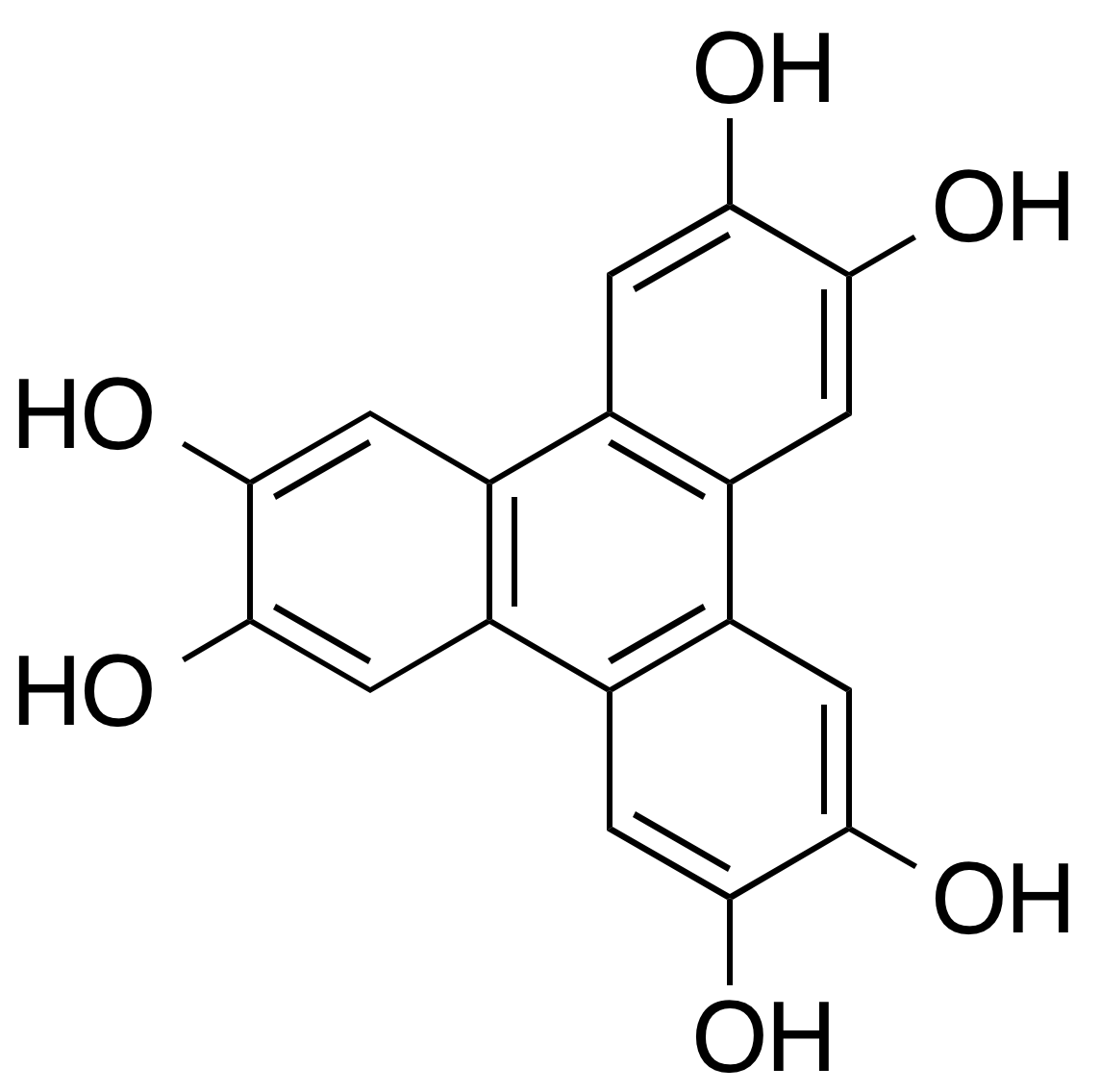
2,3,6,7,10,11-Hexahydroxytriphenylene, a building block for two-dimensional polymers

Hexahydroxytriphenylene (HHTP) is any of a set of organic compounds consisting of a polycyclic aromatic hydrocarbon core—triphenylene—with six hydroxy group substituents attached to the rings. These compounds have found use as a component of two-dimensional polymers. The first covalent organic framework used this chemical as a monomer building block. It can be used for self-assembling conductive metal−organic frameworks.
