= Porphyrazine =

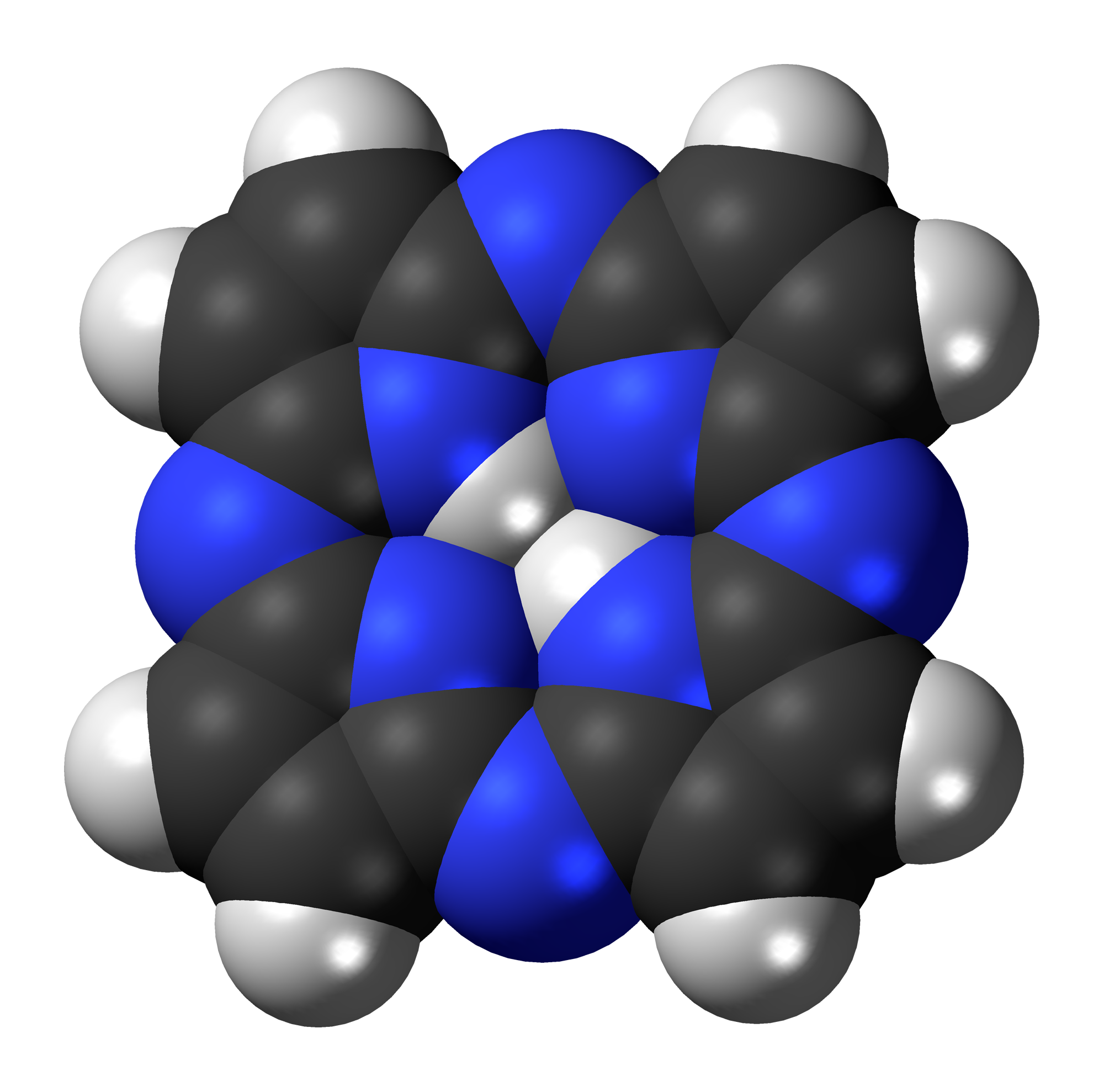

Names
- IUPAC name Porphyrazine
- Systematic IUPAC name 5,10,15,20-Tetraazaporphyrin
- Other names 5,10,15,20-Tetraazaporphine; Tetraazaporphine; Tetraazaporphyrin; Tetrazaporphin

Identifiers
CAS Number	500-77-6
3D model (JSmol)	Interactive image
ChemSpider	24785772
PubChem CID	5014177
CompTox Dashboard (EPA)	DTXSID70596945
- InChI: InChI=1S/C16H10N8/c1-2-10-17-9(1)21-11-3-4-13(18-11)23-15-7-8-16(20-15)24-14-6-5-12(19-14)22-10/h1-8H,(H2,17,18,19,20,21,22,23,24) Key: ZIDZLFREAKMVRI-UHFFFAOYSA-N
- SMILES: C1=CC3=NC1=NC5=CC=C(N=C2C=CC(=N2)N=C4C=CC(=N3)N4)N5

Properties
Chemical formula	C_{16}H_{10}N_{8}
Molar mass	314.312 g·mol^{−1}
- Except where otherwise noted, data are given for materials in their standard state (at 25 °C [77 °F], 100 kPa). Infobox references

Porphyrazines, or tetraazaporphyrins, are tetrapyrrole macrocycles similar to porphyrins and phthalocyanines. Pioneered by Sir R. Patrick Linstead as an extension of his work on phthalocyanines, porphyrazines differ from porphyrins in that they contain -meso nitrogen atoms, rather than carbon atoms, and differ from phthalocyanines in that their β-pyrrole positions are open for substitution. An extension of the aromatic core of porphyrazines, by adding pyrazine groups, can allow the formation of another class of analogs, called tetrapyrazinoporphyrazines. These differences confer physical properties that are distinct from both porphyrins and phthalocyanines.

== Synthesis ==
Porphyrazines are prepared by magnesium templated cyclization of maleonitriles. Cross-cyclization with phthalonitrile or diiminoisoindole derivatives is possible introducing a flexibile synthetic route that has led to the synthesis of porphyrazines with peripheral heterocyclic rings, heteroatom substituents (S, O, N), peripherally bound metal atoms, and mixed -benzo porphyrazine systems.

== Optical properties ==
Porphyrazines are most well known for their intense electronic absorption throughout the UV, visible, and NIR spectral regions. Electronic absorption spectra for porphyrazines are similar to those of phthalocyanines, with an intense Soret band (λ ≈ 300 - 400 nm) and Q-band (λ > 600 nm).

Porphyrazines exhibit fluorescence from the first excited singlet state (S_{1} → S_{0}) at visible and NIR wavelengths which is typical of tetrapyrrole macrocycles. Dual-emission from organic fluorophores is not common but, as observed in phthalocyanines, violet emission from an upper excited state (S_{2} → S_{0}) is observed in porphyrazines.
