= Truxene =

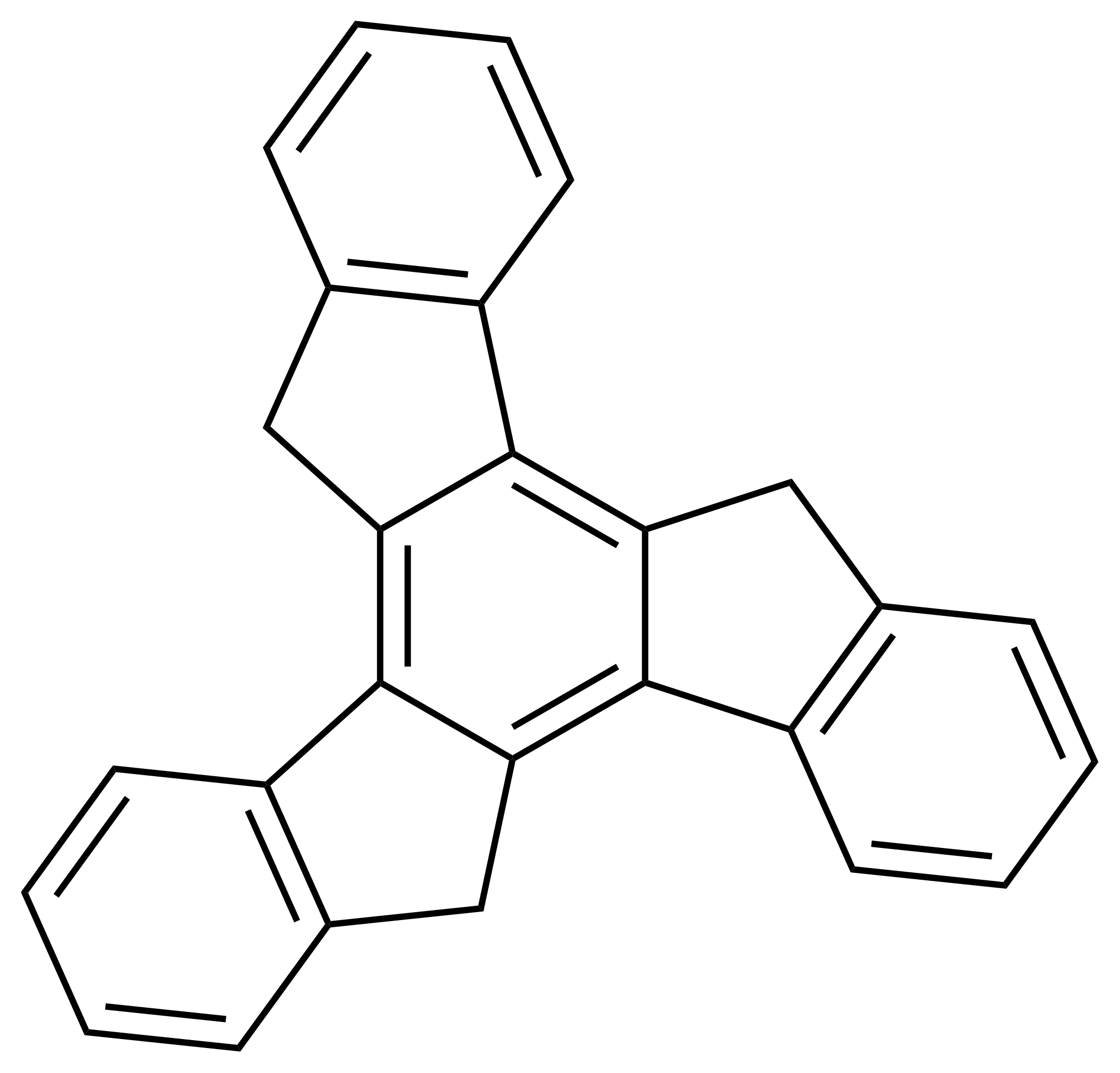
- Structural formula of truxene

Names
- Preferred IUPAC name 10,15-dihydro-5H-diindeno-[1,2-a:1',2'-c]fluorene

Identifiers
CAS Number	548-35-6
3D model (JSmol)	Interactive image
ChemSpider	61650
ECHA InfoCard	100.008.132
EC Number	208-944-7
PubChem CID	68355
CompTox Dashboard (EPA)	DTXSID60203277
- InChI: Key: YGPLLMPPZRUGTJ-UHFFFAOYSA-N; InChI=1S/C27H18/c1-4-10-19-16(7-1)13-22-25(19)23-14-17-8-3-6-12-21(17)27(23)24-15-18-9-2-5-11-20(18)26(22)24/h1-12H,13-15H2
- SMILES: C1C2=CC=CC=C2C3=C4CC5=CC=CC=C5C4=C6CC7=CC=CC=C7C6=C31

Properties
Chemical formula	C_{27}H_{18}
Molar mass	342.441 g·mol^{−1}
Density	1.286 g/cm^{3}
Melting point	378 °C (712 °F; 651 K)
- Except where otherwise noted, data are given for materials in their standard state (at 25 °C [77 °F], 100 kPa). Infobox references

Truxene is a polycyclic aromatic hydrocarbon. The molecule can be thought of as being made up of three fluorene units arranged symmetrically and sharing a common central benzene. Truxene is solid, and it is slightly soluble in water.

== History ==
Truxene has been known since the end of the 19th century. J. Hausmann came across it in 1889 while investigating the reactions of 3-phenylpropionic acid with phosphorus pentoxide. He could not determine the exact structure but assumed it was a cyclic trimer of 1-indanone. According to him, it was formed by the condensation of 1-indanone resulting from intramolecular acylation of 3-phenylpropanoic acid.

Frederic Stanley Kipping was able to confirm the structure of truxene in 1894 and obtained the compound by the trimerization of 1-indanone.

== Preparation ==
Truxene is prepared by the cyclotrimerization of 1-indanone in a mixture of acetic acid and concentrated hydrochloric acid.

== Uses ==
Truxene has a star shape, and it is therefore suitable as a starting point for the synthesis of dendrimers.

Derivatives of truxene have also been used for the synthesis of liquid crystals and fragments of fullerene.
