= Dark quencher =

Substance which absorbs energy from fluorescent substances and emits heat

In chemistry, a dark quencher (also known as a dark sucker) is a substance that absorbs excitation energy from a fluorophore and dissipates the energy as heat; while a typical (fluorescent) quencher re-emits much of this energy as light. Dark quenchers are used in molecular biology in conjunction with fluorophores. When the two are close together, such as in a molecule or protein, the fluorophore's emission is suppressed. This effect can be used to study molecular geometry and motion.

An example of its use is in TaqMan or invader assay, SNP genotyping methods. For instance, a hairpin loop with a fluorophore and quencher at the base of the stem is used. An unlabeled SNP specific PCR primer (one of many) with a specific 5' tail binds to the sequence to be probed, and the Taq polymerase extends the sequence that will have a specific 5' end dependent on the SNP (insensitive to polymorphisms upstream of the SNP in question). In the next run, a primer, complementary to that tail, with a hairpin loop is extended. In the next run, the elongation of the complementary strand will linearise the hairpin separating the fluorophore and quencher. An alternative to using quenchers is to use FRET where the combination of two dyes gives a signal.

== Mode of function ==
Dark quenchers are dyes with no native fluorescence. Until the last few years, quenchers have typically been a second fluorescent dye, for example, fluorescein as the reporter and tetramethyl-rhodamine as the quencher (FAM/TAM probes). However, quencher fluorescence can increase background noise due to overlap between the quencher and reporter fluorescence spectra. This limitation often necessitates the use of complex data analysis and optical filters. Dark quenchers offer a solution to this problem because they do not occupy an emission bandwidth. Furthermore, dark quenchers enable multiplexing (when two or more reporter-quencher probes are used together).

Fluorescent dyes absorb light, which places the dye in an excited state; the dye returns to the ground state from the excited state by emitting light (fluorescence). In a reporter – quencher system the dye nonradiatively (without light) transfers energy to the quencher. This returns the dye to the ground state and generates the quencher excited state. The quencher then returns to the ground state through emissive decay (fluorescence) or nonradiatively (dark quenching). In nonradiative or dark decay, energy is given off via molecular vibrations (heat). With the typical μM or less concentration of sample, the heat from radiationless decay is too small to affect the temperature of the solution.

== Examples of dark quenchers ==
- Dabsyl (dimethylaminoazobenzenesulfonic acid) absorbs in the green spectrum and is often used with fluorescein. (Dabsyl has a nearly identical absorption, but has a sulfonyl chloride to form more stable conjugates, instead of a succinimidyl ester).
- Black Hole Quenchers are capable of quenching across the entire visible spectrum.
- Qxl quenchers span the full visible spectrum.
- Iowa Black FQ absorbs in the green-pink part of the spectrum.
- Iowa Black RQ blocks in the orange-red, and fluorescent part of the spectrum.
- IRDye QC-1 quenches dyes from the visible to the near-infrared range (500-900 nm).
