= Electrocatalyst =

Catalyst participating in electrochemical reactions

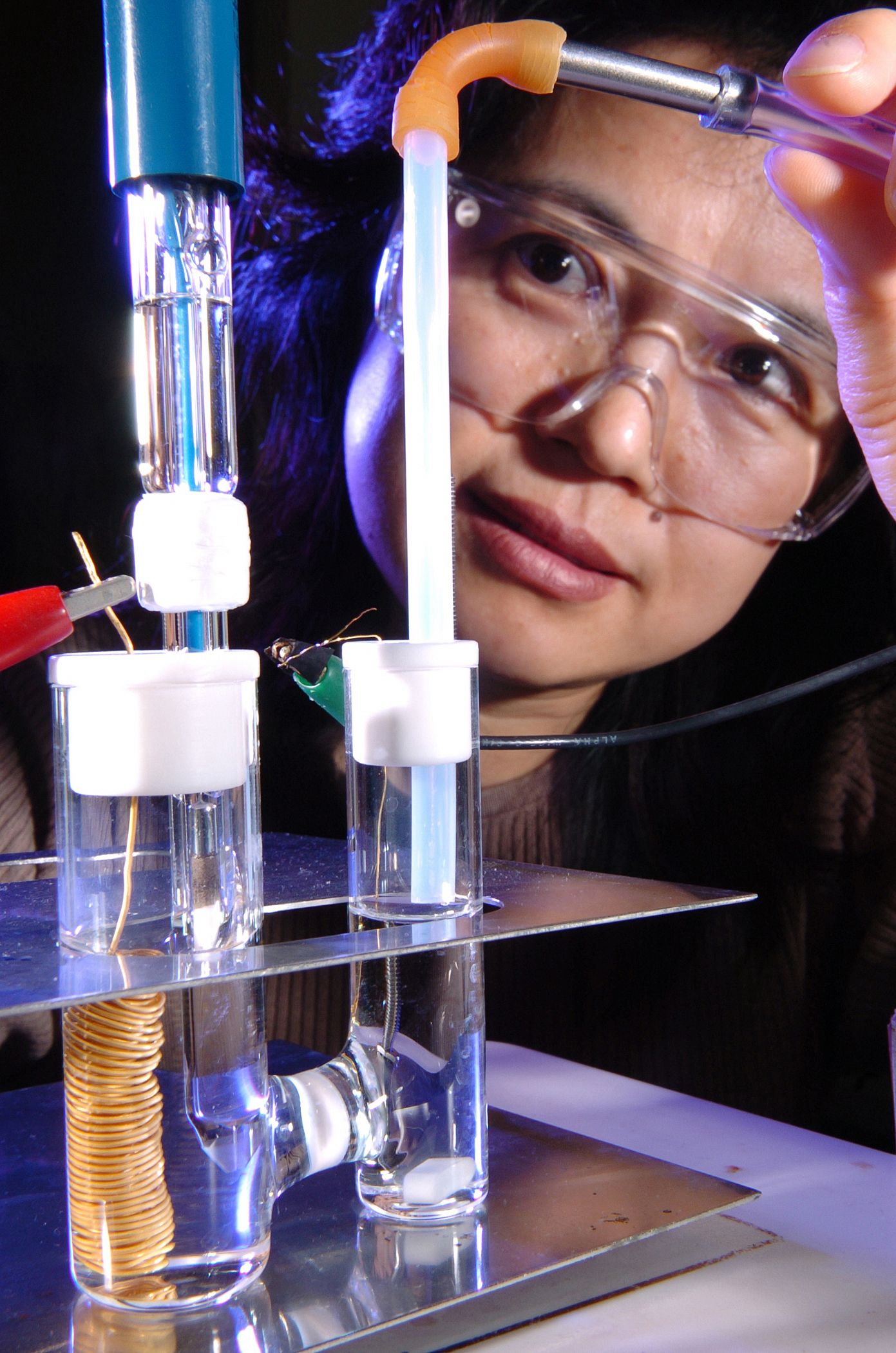
A platinum cathode electrocatalyst's stability being measured by chemist Xiaoping Wang

An electrocatalyst is a catalyst that participates in electrochemical reactions. Electrocatalysts are a specific form of catalysts that function at electrode surfaces or, most commonly, may be the electrode surface itself. An electrocatalyst can be heterogeneous such as a platinized electrode. Homogeneous electrocatalysts, which are soluble, assist in transferring electrons between the electrode and reactants, and/or facilitate an intermediate chemical transformation described by an overall half reaction. Major challenges in electrocatalysts focus on fuel cells.

== Background and theory ==
An electrocatalyst lowers the activation energy required for an electrochemical reaction. Some electrocatalysts change the potential at which oxidation and reduction processes occur. In other cases, an electrocatalyst can impart selectivity by favoring specific chemical interaction at an electrode surface. Given that electrochemical reactions occur when electrons are passed from one chemical species to another, favorable interactions at an electrode surface increase the likelihood of electrochemical transformations occurring, thus reducing the potential required to achieve these transformations.

Electrocatalysts can be evaluated according to activity, stability, and selectivity. The activity of electrocatalysts can be assessed quantitatively by the current density is generated, and therefore how fast a reaction is taking place, for a given applied potential. This relationship is described with the Tafel equation. In assessing the stability of electrocatalysts, the a key parameter is turnover number (TON). The selectivity of electrocatalysts refers to the product distribution. Selectivity can be quantitatively assessed through a selectivity coefficient, which compares the response of the material to the desired analyte or substrate with the response to other interferents.

In many electrochemical systems, including galvanic cells, fuel cells and various forms of electrolytic cells, a drawback is that they can suffer from high activation barriers. The energy diverted to overcome these activation barriers is transformed into heat. In most exothermic combustion reactions this heat would simply propagate the reaction catalytically. In a redox reaction, this heat is a useless byproduct lost to the system. The extra energy required to overcome kinetic barriers is usually described in terms of low faradaic efficiency and high overpotentials. In these systems, each of the two electrodes and its associated half-cell would require its own specialized electrocatalyst.

Half-reactions involving multiple steps, multiple electron transfers, and the evolution or consumption of gases in their overall chemical transformations, will often have considerable kinetic barriers. Furthermore, there is often more than one possible reaction at the surface of an electrode. For example, during the electrolysis of water, the anode can oxidize water through a two electron process to hydrogen peroxide or a four electron process to oxygen. The presence of an electrocatalyst could facilitate either of the reaction pathways.

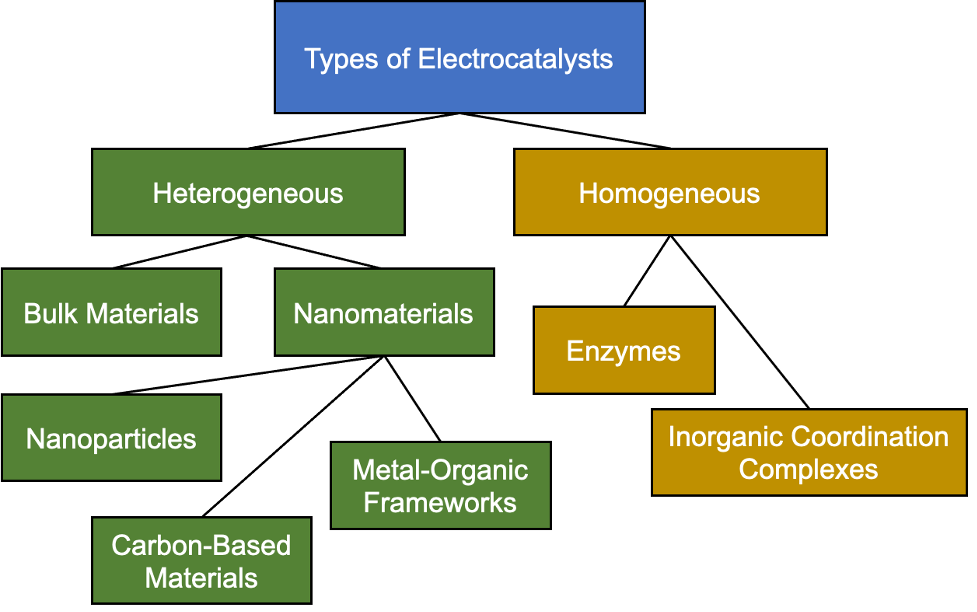
Types of electrocatalyst materials, including homogeneous and heterogeneous electrocatalysts.

== Homogeneous electrocatalysts ==
A homogeneous electrocatalyst is one that is present in the same phase of matter as the reactants, for example, a water-soluble coordination complex catalyzing an electrochemical conversion in solution. This technology is not practiced commercially, but is of research interest.

=== Synthetic coordination complexes ===
Many coordination complexes catalyze electrochemical reactions, although few have achieved commercial success. Well investigated processes include the hydrogen evolution reaction.

=== Electrification of catalytic processes ===
There is much interest in replacing traditional chemical catalysis with electrocatalysis. In such a scheme electrons supplied by an electrode are reagents. The topic is a theme within the area of green energy, because the electrons can be sourced from renewable resources. Several conversions that use hydrogen gas could be transformed into electrochemical processes that use protons. This technology remains economically noncompetitive.

Another example is found in the area of nitrogen fixation. The traditional Haber-Bosch process produces ammonia by hydrogenation of nitrogen gas:

N_{2} + 3 H_{2} → 2 NH_{3}

In the electrified version, the hydrogen is provided in the form of protons and electrons:

N_{2} + 6 H^{+} + 6 e^{−} → 2 NH_{3}

The ammonia represents an energy source since it is combustable. In this way electrification can be seen as a means for energy storage.

Another process attracting much effort is the electrochemical reduction of carbon dioxide.

=== Enzymes ===
Some enzymes can function as electrocatalysts. Nitrogenase, an enzyme that contains a MoFe cluster, can be leveraged to fix atmospheric nitrogen, i.e. convert nitrogen gas into molecules such as ammonia. Immobilizing the protein onto an electrode surface and employing an electron mediator greatly improves the efficiency of this process. The effectiveness of bioelectrocatalysts generally depends on the ease of electron transport between the active site of the enzyme and the electrode surface. Other enzymes provide insight for the development of synthetic catalysts. For example, formate dehydrogenase, a nickel-containing enzyme, has inspired the development of synthetic complexes with similar molecular structures for use in CO_{2} reduction. Microbial fuel cells are another way that biological systems can be leveraged for electrocatalytic applications. Microbial-based systems leverage the metabolic pathways of an entire organism, rather than the activity of a specific enzyme, meaning that they can catalyze a broad range of chemical reactions. Microbial fuel cells can derive current from the oxidation of substrates such as glucose, and be leveraged for processes such as CO_{2} reduction.

== Heterogeneous electrocatalysts ==
A heterogeneous electrocatalyst is one that is present in a different phase of matter from the reactants, for example, a solid surface catalyzing a reaction in solution. Different types of heterogeneous electrocatalyst materials are shown above in green. Since heterogeneous electrocatalytic reactions need an electron transfer between the solid catalyst (typically a metal) and the electrolyte, which can be a liquid solution but also a polymer or a ceramic capable of ionic conduction, the reaction kinetics depend on both the catalyst and the electrolyte as well as on the interface between them. The nature of the electrocatalyst surface determines some properties of the reaction including rate and selectivity.

=== Bulk materials ===
Electrocatalysis can occur at the surface of some bulk materials, such as platinum metal. Bulk metal surfaces of gold have been employed for the decomposition methanol for hydrogen production. Water electrolysis is conventionally conducted at inert bulk metal electrodes such as platinum or iridium. The activity of an electrocatalyst can be tuned with a chemical modification, commonly obtained by alloying two or more metals. This is due to a change in the electronic structure, especially in the d band which is considered to be responsible for the catalytic properties of noble metals.

=== Nanomaterials ===
==== Nanoparticles ====
A variety of nanoparticle materials have been demonstrated to promote various electrochemical reactions, although none have been commercialized. These catalysts can be tuned with respect to their size and shape, as well as the surface strain.

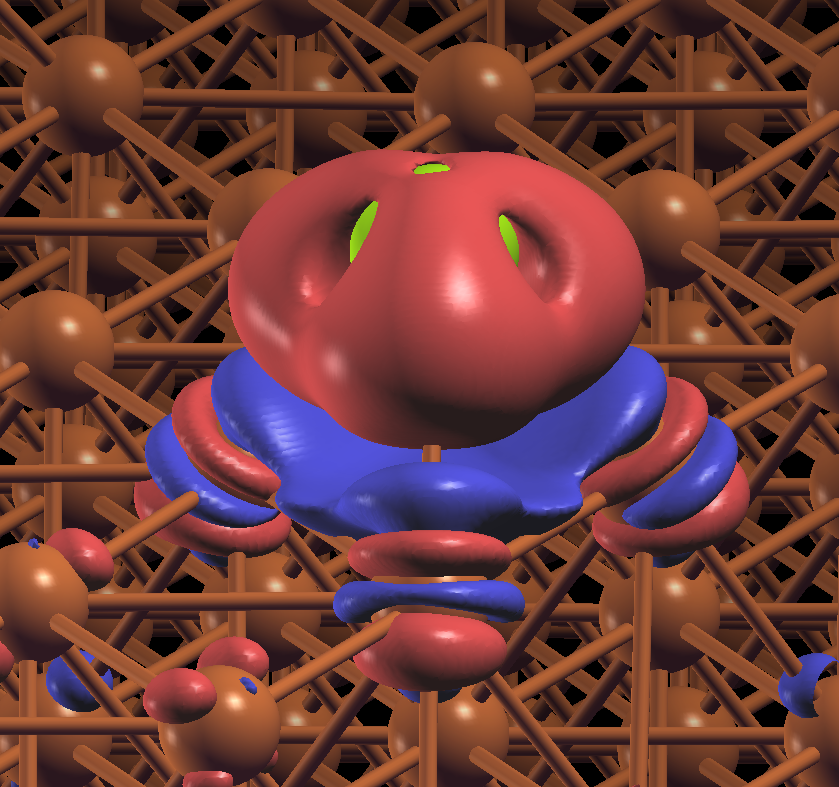
Electronic density difference of a Cl atom adsorbed on a Cu(111) surface obtained with a DFT simulation.

Also, higher reaction rates can be achieved by precisely controlling the arrangement of surface atoms: indeed, in nanometric systems, the number of available reaction sites is a better parameter than the exposed surface area in order to estimate electrocatalytic activity. Sites are the positions where the reaction could take place; the likelihood of a reaction to occur in a certain site depends on the electronic structure of the catalyst, which determines the adsorption energy of the reactants together with many other variables not yet fully clarified.

According to the TSK model, the catalyst surface atoms can be classified as terrace, step or kink atoms according to their position, each characterized by a different coordination number. In principle, atoms with lower coordination number (kinks and defects) tend to be more reactive and therefore adsorb the reactants more easily: this may promote kinetics but could also depress it if the adsorbing species isn't the reactant, thus inactivating the catalyst. Advances in nanotechnology make it possible to surface engineer the catalyst so that just some desired crystal planes are exposed to reactants, maximizing the number of effective reaction sites for the desired reaction.

To date, a generalized surface dependence mechanism cannot be formulated since every surface effect is strongly reaction-specific. A few classifications of reactions based on their surface dependence have been proposed but there are still many exceptions that do not fall into them.

===== Particle size effect =====
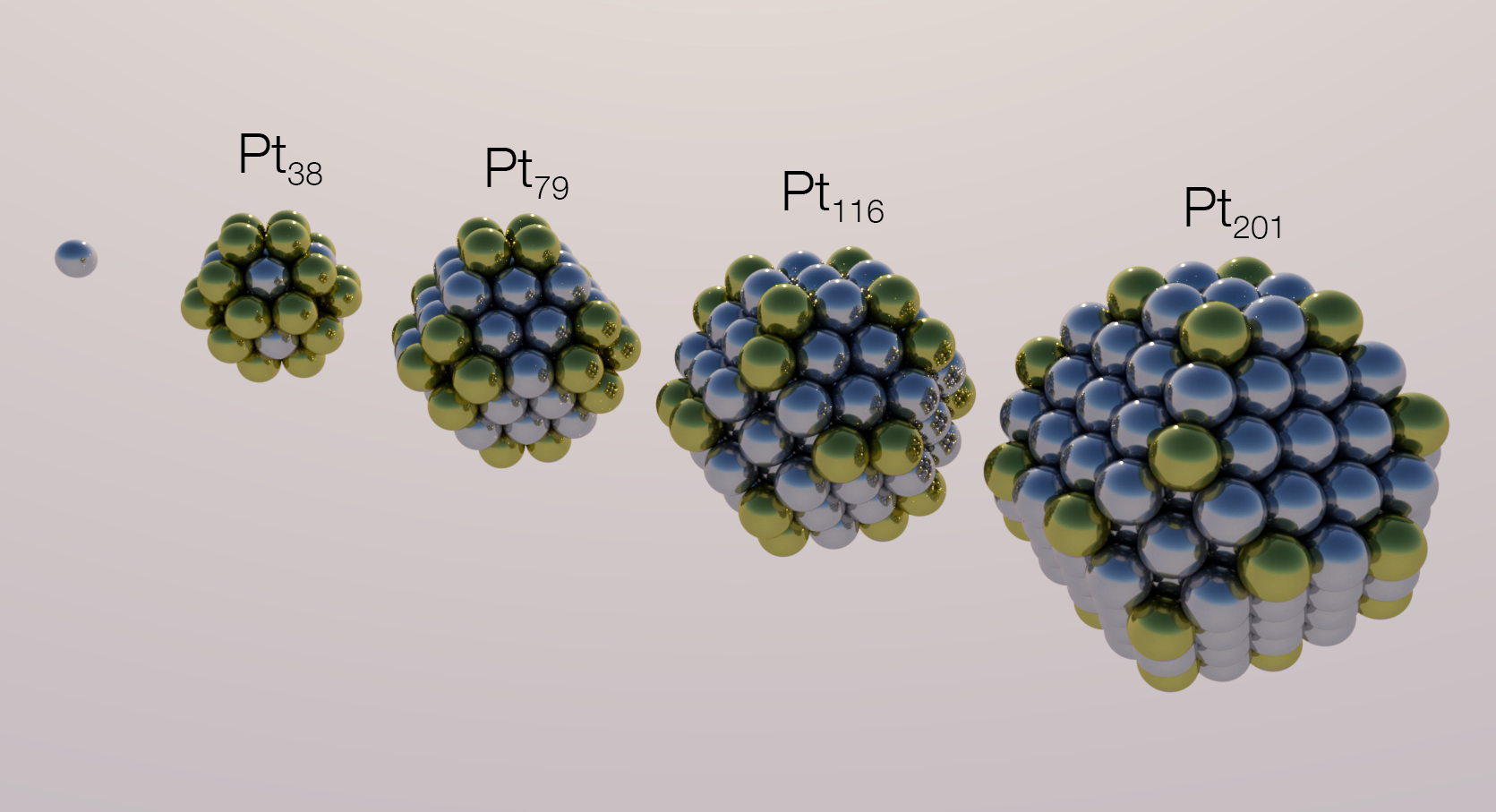
An example of a particle-size effect: the number of reaction sites of different kinds depends on the size of the particle. In this four FCC nanoparticles model, the kink site between (111) and (100) planes (coordination number 6, represented by golden spheres) is 24 for all of the four different nanoparticles, while the number of other surface sites varies.

The interest in reducing as much as possible the costs of the catalyst for electrochemical processes led to the use of fine catalyst powders since the specific surface area increases as the average particle size decreases. For instance, most common PEM fuel cells and electrolyzers design is based on a polymeric membrane charged in platinum nanoparticles as an electrocatalyst (the so-called platinum black).

Although the surface area to volume ratio is commonly considered to be the main parameter relating electrocatalyst size with its activity, to understand the particle-size effect, several more phenomena need to be taken into account:

- Equilibrium shape: for any given size of a nanoparticle there is an equilibrium shape which exactly determines its crystal planes
- Reaction sites relative number: a given size for a nanoparticle corresponds to a certain number of surface atoms and only some of them host a reaction site
- Electronic structure: below a certain size, the work function of a nanoparticle changes and its band structure fades away
- Defects: the crystal lattice of a small nanoparticle is perfect; thus, reactions enhanced by defects as reaction sites get slowed down as the particle size decreases
- Stability: small nanoparticles have the tendency to lose mass due to the diffusion of their atoms towards bigger particles, according to the Ostwald ripening phenomenon
- Capping agents: in order to stabilize nanoparticles it is necessary a capping layer, therefore part of their surface is unavailable for reactants
- Support: nanoparticles are often fixed onto a support in order to stay in place, therefore part of their surface is unavailable for reactants

==== Carbon-based materials ====
Carbon nanotubes and graphene-based materials can be used as electrocatalysts. The carbon surfaces of graphene and carbon nanotubes are well suited to the adsorption of many chemical species, which can promote certain electrocatalytic reactions. In addition, their conductivity means they are good electrode materials. Carbon nanotubes have a very high surface area, maximizing surface sites at which electrochemical transformations can occur. Graphene can also serve as a platform for constructing composites with other kinds of nanomaterials such as single atom catalysts. Because of their conductivity, carbon-based materials can potentially replace metal electrodes to perform metal-free electrocatalysis.

==== Framework materials ====
Metal—organic frameworks (MOFs), especially conductive frameworks, can be used as electrocatalysts for processes such as CO_{2} reduction and water splitting. MOFs provide potential active sites at both metal centers and organic ligand sites. They can also be functionalized, or encapsulate other materials such as nanoparticles. MOFs can also be combined with carbon-based materials to form electrocatalysts. Covalent organic frameworks (COFs), particularly those that contain metals, can also serve as electrocatalysts. COFs constructed from cobalt porphyrins demonstrated the ability to reduce carbon dioxide to carbon monoxide.

However, many MOFs are known unstable in chemical and electrochemical conditions, making it difficult to tell if MOFs are actually catalysts or precatalysts. The real active sites of MOFs during electrocatalysis need to be analyzed comprehensively.

== Research on electrocatalysis ==
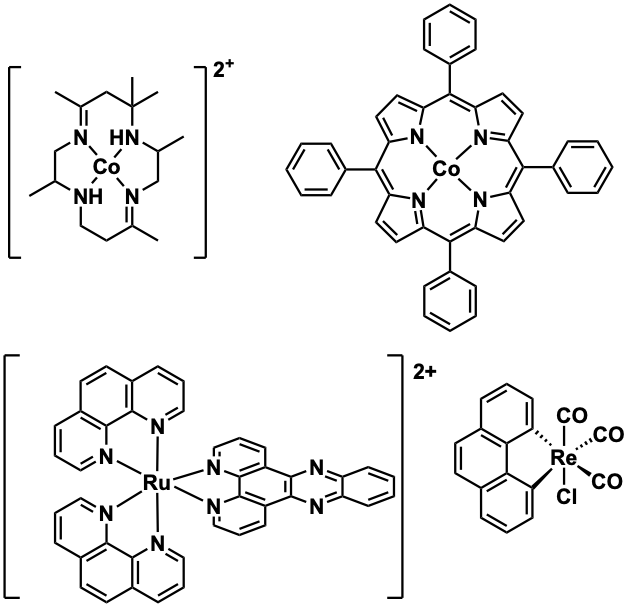
Some transition metal complexes that exhibit some activity as homogeneous electrocatalysts.

=== Water splitting / Hydrogen evolution ===
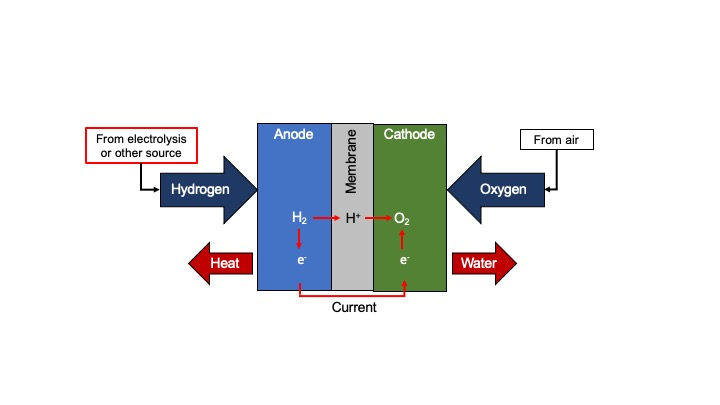
A schematic of a hydrogen fuel cell. To supply hydrogen, electrocatalytic water splitting is commonly employed.

Hydrogen and oxygen can be combined through by the use of a fuel cell. In this process, the reaction is broken into two half reactions which occur at separate electrodes. In this situation the reactant's energy is directly converted to electricity. Useful energy can be obtained from the thermal heat of this reaction through an internal combustion engine with an upper efficiency of 60% (for compression ratio of 10 and specific heat ratio of 1.4) based on the Otto thermodynamic cycle. It is also possible to combine the hydrogen and oxygen through redox mechanism as in the case of a fuel cell. In this process, the reaction is broken into two half-reactions which occur at separate electrodes. In this situation the reactant's energy is directly converted to electricity.

The standard reduction potential of hydrogen is defined as 0V, and frequently referred to as the standard hydrogen electrode (SHE).

Half Reaction	Reduction Potential E^{o}_{red} (V)
2H^{+} + 2e^{−} → H_{2 (g)}	≡ 0
O_{2(g)} + 4H^{+} + 4e^{−} → 2H_{2}O_{(l)}	+1.23

HER can be promoted by many catalysts.

=== Carbon dioxide reduction ===
Electrocatalysis for CO_{2} reduction is not practiced commercially but remains a topic of research. The reduction of CO_{2} into useable products is a potential way to combat climate change. Electrocatalysts can promote the reduction of carbon dioxide into methanol and other useful fuel and stock chemicals. The most valuable reduction products of CO_{2} are those that have a higher energy content, meaning that they can be reused as fuels. Thus, catalyst development focuses on the production of products such as methane and methanol. Homogeneous catalysts, such as enzymes and synthetic coordination complexes have been employed for this purpose. A variety of nanomaterials have also been studied for CO_{2} reduction, including carbon-based materials and framework materials.

=== Ethanol-powered fuel cells ===
Aqueous solutions of methanol can decompose into CO_{2} hydrogen gas, and water. Although this process is thermodynamically favored, the activation barrier is extremely high, so in practice this reaction is not typically observed. However, electrocatalysts can speed up this reaction greatly, making methanol a possible route to hydrogen storage for fuel cells. Electrocatalysts such as gold, platinum, and various carbon-based materials have been shown to effectively catalyze this process. An electrocatalyst of platinum and rhodium on carbon backed tin-dioxide nanoparticles can break carbon bonds at room temperature with only carbon dioxide as a by-product, so that ethanol can be oxidized into the necessary hydrogen ions and electrons required to create electricity.

=== Chemical synthesis ===
Electrocatalysts are used to promote certain chemical reactions to obtain synthetic products. Graphene and graphene oxides have shown promise as electrocatalytic materials for synthesis. Electrocatalytic methods also have potential for polymer synthesis. Electrocatalytic synthesis reactions can be performed under a constant current, constant potential, or constant cell-voltage conditions, depending on the scale and purpose of the reaction.

=== Advanced oxidation processes in water treatment ===
Water treatment systems often require the degradation of hazardous compounds. These treatment processes are dubbed Advanced oxidation processes, and are key in destroying byproducts from disinfection, pesticides, and other hazardous compound. There is an emerging effort to enable these processes to destroy more tenacious compounds, especially PFAS

== Additional reading ==
- Valenti, G.; Boni, A.; Melchionna, M.; Cargnello, M.; Nasi, L.; Bertoli, G.; Gorte, R. J.; Marcaccio, M.; Rapino, S.; Bonchio, M.; Fornasiero, P.; Prato, M.; Paolucci, F. (2016). "Co-axial heterostructures integrating palladium/titanium dioxide with carbon nanotubes for efficient electrocatalytic hydrogen evolution". Nature Communications. 7 13549. Bibcode:2016NatCo...713549V. doi:10.1038/ncomms13549. PMC 5159813. PMID 27941752.

== See also ==
- Electrochemistry
- Catalysis
- Electrolysis of water
- Non-faradaic electrochemical modification of catalytic activity
- Tafel equation
