= Van der Pauw method =

Technique to measure resistivity and Hall coefficient

The van der Pauw Method is a technique commonly used to measure the resistivity and the Hall coefficient of a sample. Its strength lies in its ability to accurately measure the properties of a sample of any arbitrary shape, as long as the sample is approximately two-dimensional (i.e. it is much thinner than it is wide), solid (no holes), and the electrodes are placed on its perimeter. The van der Pauw method employs a four-point probe placed around the perimeter of the sample, in contrast to the linear four point probe: this allows the van der Pauw method to provide an average resistivity of the sample, whereas a linear array provides the resistivity in the sensing direction. This difference becomes important for anisotropic materials, which can be properly measured using the Montgomery Method, an extension of the van der Pauw Method (see, for instance, reference).

From the measurements made, the following properties of the material can be calculated:

- The resistivity of the material
- The doping type (i.e. whether it is a P-type or N-type material)
- The sheet carrier density of the majority carrier (the number of majority carriers per unit area). From this the charge density and doping level can be found
- The mobility of the majority carrier

The method was first propounded by Leo J. van der Pauw in 1958.

== Conditions ==
There are five conditions that must be satisfied to use this technique:
1. The sample must have a flat shape of uniform thickness
2. The sample must not have any isolated holes
3. The sample must be homogeneous and isotropic
4. All four contacts must be located at the edges of the sample
5. The area of contact of any individual contact should be at least an order of magnitude smaller than the area of the entire sample.

The second condition can be weakened. The van der Pauw technique can also be applied to samples with one hole.

== Sample preparation ==
In order to use the van der Pauw method, the sample thickness must be much less than the width and length of the sample. In order to reduce errors in the calculations, it is preferable that the sample be symmetrical. There must also be no isolated holes within the sample.

Some possible contact placements

The measurements require that four ohmic contacts be placed on the sample. Certain conditions for their placement need to be met:

- They must be as small as possible; any errors given by their non-zero size will be of the order D/L, where D is the average diameter of the contact and L is the distance between the contacts.
- They must be as close as possible to the boundary of the sample.

In addition to this, any leads from the contacts should be constructed from the same batch of wire to minimise thermoelectric effects. For the same reason, all four contacts should be of the same material.

== Measurement definitions ==
- The contacts are numbered from 1 to 4 in a counter-clockwise order, beginning at the top-left contact.
- The current I_{12} is a positive DC current injected into contact 1 and taken out of contact 2, and is measured in amperes (A).
- The voltage V_{34} is a DC voltage measured between contacts 3 and 4 (i.e. V_{4} - V_{3}) with no externally applied magnetic field, measured in volts (V).
- The resistivity ρ is measured in ohms⋅metres (Ω⋅m).
- The thickness of the sample t is measured in metres (m).
- The sheet resistance R_{S} is measured in ohms per square (Ω/sq or $\Omega/\Box$).

== Resistivity measurements ==
The average resistivity of a sample is given by ρ = R_{S}⋅t, where the sheet resistance R_{S} is determined as follows. For an anisotropic material, the individual resistivity components, e.g. ρ_{x} or ρ_{y}, can be calculated using the Montgomery method.

=== Basic measurements ===
To make a measurement, a current is caused to flow along one edge of the sample (for instance, I_{12}) and the voltage across the opposite edge (in this case, V_{34}) is measured. From these two values, a resistance (for this example, $R_{12,34}$) can be found using Ohm's law:

$$R_{12,34} = \frac{V_{34}}{I_{12}}$$

In his paper, van der Pauw showed that the sheet resistance of samples with arbitrary shapes can be determined from two of these resistances - one measured along a vertical edge, such as $R_{12,34}$, and a corresponding one measured along a horizontal edge, such as $R_{23,41}$. The actual sheet resistance is related to these resistances by the van der Pauw formula

$$e^{-\pi R_{12,34}/R_s}+e^{-\pi R_{23,41}/R_s}=1$$

=== Reciprocal measurements ===
The reciprocity theorem tells us that
$$R_{AB,CD} = R_{CD,AB}$$

Therefore, it is possible to obtain a more precise value for the resistances $R_{12,34}$ and $R_{23,41}$ by making two additional measurements of their reciprocal values $R_{34,12}$ and $R_{41,23}$ and averaging the results.

We define
$$R_{\text{vertical}} = \frac{R_{12,34} + R_{34,12}}{2}$$
and
$$R_{\text{horizontal}} = \frac{R_{23,41} + R_{41,23}}{2}$$

Then, the van der Pauw formula becomes
$$e^{-\pi R_{\text{vertical}}/R_S}+e^{-\pi R_{\text{horizontal}}/R_S}=1$$

=== Reversed polarity measurements ===
A further improvement in the accuracy of the resistance values can be obtained by repeating the resistance measurements after switching polarities of both the current source and the voltage meter. Since this is still measuring the same portion of the sample, just in the opposite direction, the values of R_{vertical} and R_{horizontal} can still be calculated as the averages of the standard and reversed polarity measurements. The benefit of doing this is that any offset voltages, such as thermoelectric potentials due to the Seebeck effect, will be cancelled out.

Combining these methods with the reciprocal measurements from above leads to the formulas for the resistances being

$$R_{\text{vertical}} = \frac{R_{12,34} + R_{34,12} + R_{21,43} + R_{43,21}}{4}$$

and

$$R_{\text{horizontal}} = \frac{R_{23,41} + R_{41,23} + R_{32,14} + R_{14,32}}{4}$$

The van der Pauw formula takes the same form as in the previous section.

=== Measurement accuracy ===
Both of the above procedures check the repeatability of the measurements. If any of the reversed polarity measurements don't agree to a sufficient degree of accuracy (usually within 3%) with the corresponding standard polarity measurement, then there is probably a source of error somewhere in the setup, which should be investigated before continuing. The same principle applies to the reciprocal measurements – they should agree to a sufficient degree before they are used in any calculations.

=== Calculating sheet resistance ===
In general, the van der Pauw formula cannot be rearranged to give the sheet resistance R_{S} in terms of known functions. The most notable exception to this is when R_{vertical} = R = R_{horizontal}; in this scenario the sheet resistance is given by

$$R_S = \frac{\pi R}{\ln 2}$$

The quotient $\pi/\ln 2$ is known as the van der Pauw constant and has approximate value 4.53236. In most other scenarios, an iterative method is used to solve the van der Pauw formula numerically for R_{S}. Typically a formula is considered to fail the preconditions for Banach Fixed Point Theorem, so methods based on it do not work. Instead, nested intervals converge slowly but steadily. Recently, however, it has been shown that an appropriate reformulation of the van der Pauw problem (e.g., by introducing a second van der Pauw formula) makes it fully solvable by the Banach fixed point method.

Alternatively, a Newton-Raphson method converges relatively quickly. To reduce the complexity of the notation, the following variables are introduced:

$$s = e^{-\pi/{R_s}}$$
$$R_v = R_{vertical}$$
$$R_h = R_{horizontal}$$

Then the next approximation $R_s^+$ is calculated by

$$R_s^+ = R_s + R_s^2\frac{1-s^{R_v} - s^{R_h}}{\pi (R_v s^{R_v} + R_h s^{R_h})}$$

== Hall measurements ==
=== Background ===
When a charged particle—such as an electron—is placed in a magnetic field, it experiences a Lorentz force proportional to the strength of the field and the velocity at which it is traveling through it. This force is strongest when the direction of motion is perpendicular to the direction of the magnetic field; in this case the force

$$F_L = qvB\,\!$$

where $q$ is the charge on the particle in coulombs, $v$ the velocity it is traveling at (centimeters per second), and $B$ the strength of the magnetic field (Wb/cm^{2}). Note that centimeters are often used to measure length in the semiconductor industry, which is why they are used here instead of the SI units of meters.

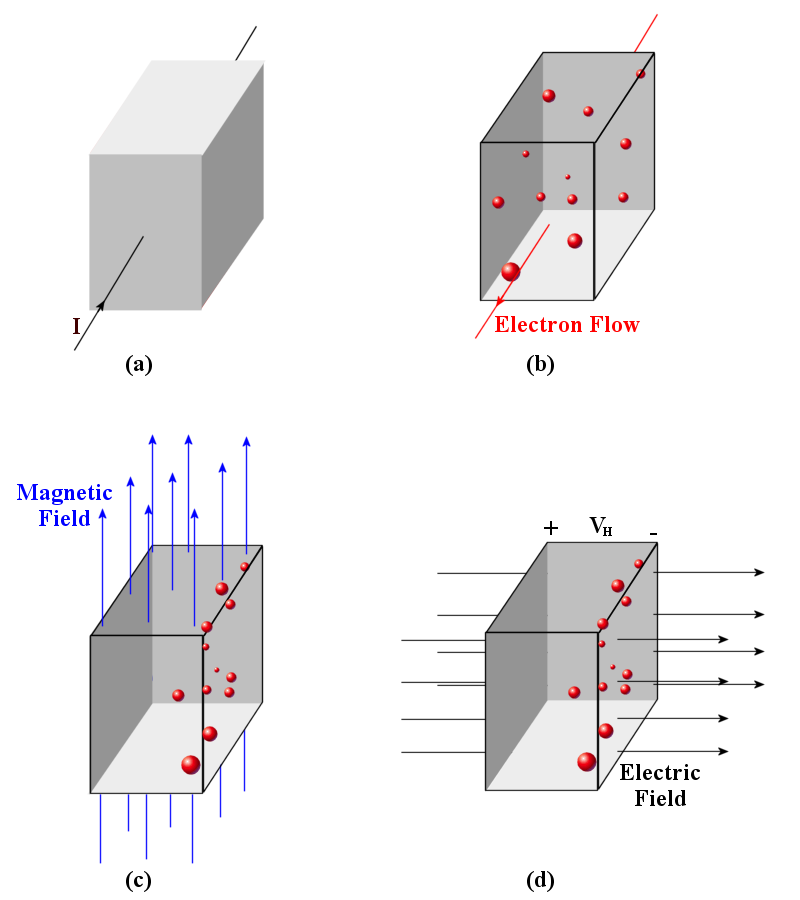
The Hall effect as it is used for the van der Pauw method. (a) - a current flowing through a piece of semiconductor material (b) - the electrons flowing due to the current (c) - the electrons accumulating at one edge due to the magnetic field (d) - the resulting electric field and Hall voltage $V_H$

When a current is applied to a piece of semiconducting material, this results in a steady flow of electrons through the material (as shown in parts (a) and (b) of the accompanying figure). The velocity the electrons are traveling at is (see electric current):

$$v = \frac{I}{nAq}$$

where $n$ is the electron density, $A$ is the cross-sectional area of the material and $q$ the elementary charge (1.602×10^{−19} coulombs).

If an external magnetic field is then applied perpendicular to the direction of current flow, then the resulting Lorentz force will cause the electrons to accumulate at one edge of the sample (see part (c) of the figure). Combining the above two equations, and noting that $q$ is the charge on an electron, results in a formula for the Lorentz force experienced by the electrons:

$$F_L = \frac{IB}{nA}$$

This accumulation will create an electric field across the material due to the uneven distribution of charge, as shown in part (d) of the figure. This in turn leads to a potential difference across the material, known as the Hall voltage $V_H$. The current, however, continues to only flow along the material, which indicates that the force on the electrons due to the electric field balances the Lorentz force. Since the force on an electron from an electric field $\epsilon$ is $q\epsilon$, we can say that the strength of the electric field is therefore

$$\epsilon = \frac{IB}{qnA}$$

Finally, the magnitude of the Hall voltage is simply the strength of the electric field multiplied by the width of the material; that is,

$$\begin{align}
V_H &= w\epsilon \\
&= \frac{wIB}{qnA} \\
&= \frac{IB}{qnt}
\end{align}$$

where $t$ is the thickness of the material. Since the sheet density $n_s$ is defined as the density of electrons multiplied by the thickness of the material, we can define the Hall voltage in terms of the sheet density:

$$V_H = \frac{IB}{qn_s}$$

=== Making the measurements ===
Two sets of measurements need to be made: one with a magnetic field in the positive z-direction as shown above, and one with it in the negative z-direction. From here on in, the voltages recorded with a positive field will have a subscript P (for example, V_{13, P} = V_{3, P} - V_{1, P}) and those recorded with a negative field will have a subscript N (such as V_{13, N} = V_{3, N} - V_{1, N}). For all of the measurements, the magnitude of the injected current should be kept the same; the magnitude of the magnetic field needs to be the same in both directions also.

First of all with a positive magnetic field, the current I_{24} is applied to the sample and the voltage V_{13, P} is recorded; note that the voltages can be positive or negative. This is then repeated for I_{13} and V_{42, P}.

As before, we can take advantage of the reciprocity theorem to provide a check on the accuracy of these measurements. If we reverse the direction of the currents (i.e. apply the current I_{42} and measure V_{31, P}, and repeat for I_{31} and V_{24, P}), then V_{13, P} should be the same as V_{31, P} to within a suitably small degree of error. Similarly, V_{42, P} and V_{24, P} should agree.

Having completed the measurements, a negative magnetic field is applied in place of the positive one, and the above procedure is repeated to obtain the voltage measurements V_{13, N}, V_{42, N}, V_{31, N} and V_{24, N}.

=== Calculations ===
Initially, the difference of the voltages for positive and negative magnetic fields is calculated:

V_{13} = V_{13, P} − V_{13, N}
V_{24} = V_{24, P} − V_{24, N}
V_{31} = V_{31, P} − V_{31, N}
V_{42} = V_{42, P} − V_{42, N}

The overall Hall voltage is then

$$V_H = \frac{V_{13} + V_{24} + V_{31} + V_{42}}{8}$$.

The polarity of this Hall voltage indicates the type of material the sample is made of; if it is positive, the material is P-type, and if it is negative, the material is N-type.

The formula given in the background can then be rearranged to show that the sheet density

$$n_s = \frac{IB}{q|V_H|}$$

Note that the strength of the magnetic field B needs to be in units of Wb/cm^{2} if n_{s} is in cm^{−2}. For instance, if the strength is given in the commonly used units of teslas, it can be converted by multiplying it by 10^{−4}.

== Other calculations ==
=== Mobility ===
The resistivity of a semiconductor material can be shown to be

$$\rho = \frac{1}{q(n\mu_n + p\mu_p)}$$

where n and p are the concentration of electrons and holes in the material respectively, and μ_{n} and μ_{p} are the mobility of the electrons and holes respectively.

Generally, the material is sufficiently doped so that there is a difference of many orders-of-magnitude between the two concentrations, allowing this equation to be simplified to

$$\rho = \frac{1}{qn_m\mu_m}$$

where n_{m} and μ_{m} are the doping level and mobility of the majority carrier respectively.

If we then note that the sheet resistance R_{S} is the resistivity divided by the thickness of the sample, and that the sheet density n_{S} is the doping level multiplied by the thickness, we can divide the equation through by the thickness to get

$$R_s = \frac{1}{qn_s\mu_m}$$

This can then be rearranged to give the majority carrier mobility in terms of the previously calculated sheet resistance and sheet density:

$$\mu_m = \frac{1}{qn_sR_s}$$
