= Ilaria Testa =

Physicist

- Education: University of Genoa
- Occupation: Physicist
- Known for: RESOLFT, superresolution microscopy
- Scientific career
- Workplaces: Max Planck Institute for Multidisciplinary Sciences; KTH Royal Institute of Technology
- Academic advisors: Alberto Diaspro; Stefan Hell
- Website: www.testalab.org

Ilaria Testa is an Italian-born scientist who is a Professor at the Department of Applied Physics at the School of Engineering Science at the KTH Royal Institute of Technology. She has made major contributions to advanced microscopy, particularly superresolution microscopy (RESOLFT, STED).

== Education ==
Testa studied physics at University of Genoa in Italy and graduated with a M.Sc. in 2005. In 2009, she earned her Ph.D. in Biotechnology. During her Ph.D., she worked on quantitative methods in single-molecule biophysics and studied transitional states in fluorescent proteins. After completing her thesis, supervised by Alberto Diaspro, she joined Stefan Hell's research group at the Max Planck Institute for Multidisciplinary Sciences in Göttingen, Germany as a postdoctoral researcher where she had already spent part of her doctoral studies.

== Career and research ==
At the Max Planck Institute for Multidisciplinary Sciences in Göttingen, Testa played a central role in establishing the superresolution technique RESOLFT, showing that superresolution microscopy can be realized with lower levels of light in living cells and tissues making it more attractive for its usage in the life sciences.

From 2015 to 2024, Testa was appointed as a Fellow at the SciLifeLab in Stockholm and served as both an assistant professor and an associate professor at the KTH Royal Institute of Technology. At the SciLifeLab, she set up the Laboratory for Advanced Optical BioImaging.

In November 2024, she was appointed professor at the KTH Royal Institute of Technology.

Testa and her team continue to develop further and use superresolution techniques such as STED and RESOLFT microscopy to understand the fundamental biological processes for health and diseases.

Testa is a microscopist who is a member of the advanced microscopy community and is frequently invited on panels and as a keynote speaker at key conferences in the field.

== Awards and honors ==
- 2015, ERC Starting Grant "MoNaLISA"
- 2017, ESP Young Investigator Award
- 2020, ERC Consolidator Grant "InSpIRe"
- 2025, RMS Award for Light Microscopy
