= Francisco Balzarotti =

Argentinian scientist

- Born: 1983 (age 42–43); Buenos Aires, Argentina
- Education: University of Buenos Aires (Diploma, PhD)
- Known for: MINFLUX, super-resolution microscopy, Single Molecule Tracking, Light Microscopy
- Scientific career
- Fields: physics, electronics, optics, microscopy
- Workplaces: Research Institute of Molecular Pathology, IMP; Max Planck Institute for Biophysical Chemistry
- Website: www.balzarotti-lab.org

Francisco Balzarotti (born in 1983 in Buenos Aires, Argentina) is an Argentinian scientist known for his work in super-resolution microscopy, particularly MINFLUX. He is a Group Leader at the Research Institute of Molecular Pathology (IMP) in Vienna, Austria.

== Education ==
From 2002 to 2007, Balzarotti studied electrical engineering at the University of Buenos Aires in Buenos Aires, Argentina. In 2012, he earned his Ph.D. in Electrical Engineering, working on research topics such as nanophotonics, optical nanolithography, superlenses, and plasmonics.

== Career and research ==
For his postgraduate work, Balzarotti relocated to Germany to work as a postdoctoral researcher in the Department of NanoBiophotonics at the Max Planck Institute for Biophysical Chemistry, led by Nobel Laureate Stefan W. Hell.

In Göttingen, Balzarotti played a central role in developing the super-resolution microscopy method MINFLUX which was named Breakthrough of the Year in 2017 by Physics World. The method was even described as the Holy Grail in Light Microscopy.

MINFLUX combines elements of information theory with the single-emitter nature of PALM/STORM and the beam geometries typically used in STED. During Balzarotti's time in Göttingen, they were able to show that with MINFLUX, a given localization precision can be obtained by using much fewer photons than in conventional centroid-localization techniques such as PALM/STORM. Hence, MINFLUX attains nanometer-scale resolution more quickly and with fewer emitted photons than previously possible. Subsequent work increased the application space of the technology even further.

Since 2020, Balzarotti has been a Group Leader at the Research Institute of Molecular Pathology (IMP) in Vienna, Austria, supported by the European Research Council. At the IMP, he set up the Advanced Microscopy and Biophysics group.

Balzarotti's group focuses on the development of novel optical methods and instrumentation for the observation of biological phenomena with the highest fidelity. His interdisciplinary group combines expertise in physics, engineering, mathematics, and biology.

Balzarotti has been a speaker at several microscopy conferences.

Balzarotti's group in collaboration with Mark Bates, organized the Single Molecule Localization Symposium 2023, which was hosted at IMP in Vienna.

== Awards and honours ==
- 2024 Frontiers of Science Award
- 2019 European Research Council (ERC) Starting Grant "NANO4LIFE"
