= Gražvydas Lukinavičius =

Biochemist (b. 1978)

- Born: Jurbarkas, Lithuania
- Citizenship: Lithuanian
- Education: Vilnius University
- Spouse: Rūta (biochemist)
- Scientific career
- Fields: Fluorescent tag, protein, DNA, biochemistry
- Workplaces: École polytechnique fédérale de Lausanne; Max Planck Institute for Biophysical Chemistry
- Thesis: Sequence-specific labeling of DNA via Methyltransferase-Directed Transfer of Activated Groups (mTAG) (2007)
- Doctoral advisor: Saulius Klimašauskas
- Other academic advisors: Stefan Hell, Kai Johnsson

Gražvydas Lukinavičius is a Lithuanian biochemist. His scientific interest and main area of research is focused on labeling of biomolecules and visualization using super-resolution microscopy. He is co-invertor of DNA labeling technology known as Methyltransferase-Directed Transfer of Activated Groups (mTAG) and biocompatible and cell permeable fluorophore – silicon-rhodamine (SiR). Both inventions were commercialized. He is studying labeling methods and apply them for chromatin dynamics visualization in living cells.

== Early life ==
He was born in the family of an electrician and a land development specialist. Lukinavičius finished secondary school in Jurbarkas.

== Research ==
Lukinavičius completed his bachelor's degree and master's degree in biochemistry at the Vilnius University in 2000 and 2002 respectively. During this period he worked as a research assistant in Saulius Klimašauskas group and investigating conformational movements of the catalytic loop of DNA methyltransferase.

Later he became interested in S-Adenosyl methionine analogues which can be cofactors for methyltransferases. He collaborated with Elmar Weinhold from RWTH Aachen University and learned chemical synthesis and received his PhD in biochemistry at Vilnius University, Lithuania in September 2007. This led to the development of a new DNA labeling method, the Methyltransferase-Directed Transfer of Activated Groups (mTAG). This method was applied for optical DNA mapping and for a profiling epigenetic modifications by several research groups.

After obtaining his PhD, he moved to École polytechnique fédérale de Lausanne for postdoctoral research where he continued on working with protein labeling methods in group of Kai Johnsson. He improved SNAP-tag protein labelling technology by developing a new biocompatible fluorophore, silicon-rhodamine (SiR). During this period, he began a collaboration with Stefan Hell to perform one of the first super-resolution microscopy experiments of living cells.

In 2016, Stefan Hell invited Lukinavičius to the Department of NanoBiophotonics of the Max Planck Institute for Biophysical Chemistry in Göttingen. He has continued working on fluorescence labeling of biomolecules and started a Chromatin Labeling and Imaging group in 2018.

== Memberships ==
- Member of the Lithuanian Biochemical Society (since 2003)
- Member of the Royal Society of Chemistry (since 2016)
- Member of the International Chemical Biology Society (since 2017)
- Member of the American Chemical Society (since 2021)
- Member of the Sigma Xi (since 2023)

== Publications ==
His most-cited publications, according to Google Scholar are:

- Lukinavičius, G., K. Umezawa, N. Olivier, A. Honigmann, G. Yang, T. Plass, V. Mueller, L. Reymond, I. R. Corrêa, Z.-G. Luo, C. Schultz, E. A. Lemke, P. Heppenstall, C. Eggeling, S. Manley and K. Johnsson (2013). A near-infrared fluorophore for live-cell super-resolution microscopy of cellular proteins. Nature Chemistry 5(2): 132-139. (cited 837 times)
- Lukinavičius, G., L. Reymond, E. D’Este, A. Masharina, F. Göttfert, H. Ta, A. Güther, M. Fournier, S. Rizzo, H. Waldmann, C. Blaukopf, C. Sommer, D. W. Gerlich, H.-D. Arndt, S. W. Hell and K. Johnsson (2014). Fluorogenic probes for live-cell imaging of the cytoskeleton. Nature Methods 11(7):731-3. (cited 817 times)
- Dalhoff C., G. Lukinavičius, S. Klimašauskas and E. Weinhold (2006). Direct transfer of extended groups from synthetic cofactors by DNA methyltransferases. Nature Chemical Biology 2, 31-2. (cited 252 times)
- Lukinavičius, G., C. Blaukopf, E. Pershagen, A. Schena, L. Reymond, E. Derivery, M. Gonzalez-Gaitan, E. D’Este, S. W. Hell, D. W. Gerlich and Kai Johnsson (2015). SiR–Hoechst is a far-red DNA stain for live-cell nanoscopy. Nature Communications 6, 8497. (Cited 276 times)
- Liutkevičiūtė, Z., G. Lukinavičius, V. Masevičius, D. Daujotytė and S. Klimašauskas (2009). Cytosine-5-methyltransferases add aldehydes to DNA. Nature Chemical Biology 5, 400-402. (cited 173 times)
