= Expansion microscopy =

Utilizing polymers to examine small biological samples

Expansion microscopy (ExM) is a sample preparation tool for biological samples that allows investigators to identify small structures by expanding them using a polymer system. The premise is to introduce a polymer network into cellular or tissue samples, and then physically expand that polymer network using chemical reactions to increase the size of the biological structures. Among other benefits, ExM allows those small structures to be imaged with a wider range of microscopy techniques. It was first proposed in a 2015 article by Fei Chen, Paul W. Tillberg, and Edward Boyden. As of 2019 this allowed for the expansion of samples up to 16× (16^{3} = 4096× in volume) larger than their initial size, and larger expansion ratios are under investigation. This technique has been found useful in various laboratory settings, such as analyzing biological molecules. ExM allows researchers to use standard equipment in identifying small structures, but requires strict procedures to ensure clear results.

== Principles ==
=== Purpose ===
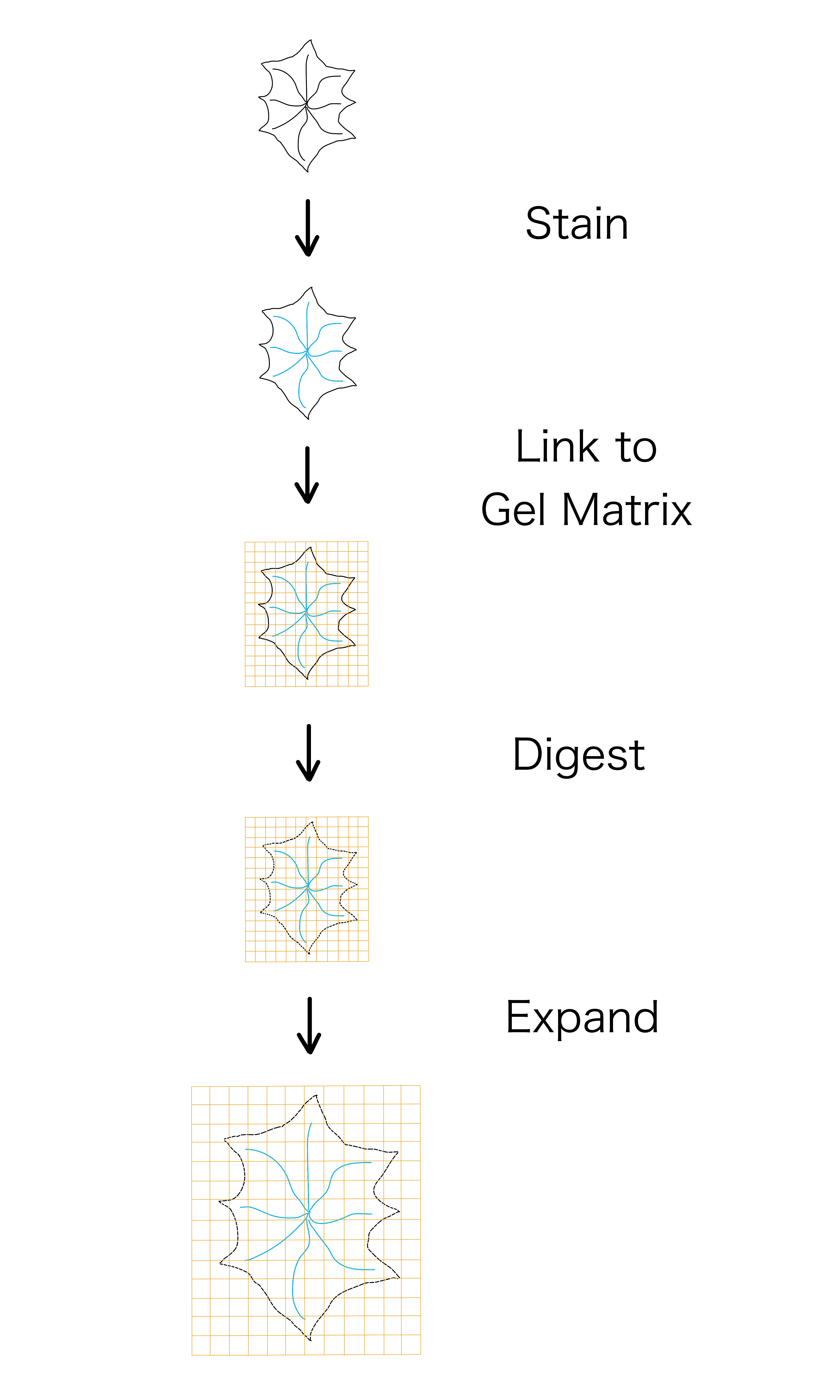
4-step process of ExM

Traditional light microscopy has limits of resolution that prevent it from reliably distinguishing small structures that are important to biological function, and must instead be imaged by a higher-resolution technique, such as electron microscopy. For example, synaptic vesicles are 40-50 nanometers in diameter, which is below the commonly quoted resolution limit of 200 nanometers for light microscopy. Expansion microscopy solves this problem by expanding the underlying tissue sample. One key advantage of samples prepared using expansion microscopy and light microscopy over conventional electron microscopy is that it also allows investigators to stain for and visualize particular molecules in the sample, such as specific proteins or RNA to identify their density and distribution in relation to the biological structures of interest. The most beneficial principle of expansion microscopy is that it requires no specialized equipment; the materials for expansion are worth little to nothing compared to the price of a microscope that could get the same resolution.

=== Stages ===
Expansion microscopy is a multistep process that, depending on the protocol, has different requirements for gelation and expansion. The standard sequence of steps are stain, link, digest, and expand.

1. The staining process can take many different forms, and only requires that the fluorophores used can attach to the polymer in the next step. By binding to certain biological molecules, the fluorophore/dye molecules form an image of their distribution.
2. Linking is the process of adding a polymer gel to the sample, which permeabilize through the sample. The linking step also includes, as the name suggests, the process of chemically linking the fluorophores to the gel.
3. The digestion step involves adding a solution that digests the sample, removing the structure. If this step fails, the gel will not expand uniformly because the sample will try to stay together. Failure of this step can also cause cracking or fractures in the sample.
4. Lastly, expansion causes the gel to be physically expanded in all directions, which causes the image formed by the fluorophores that are attached to the gel to expand as well.

== History ==
In 2015, Chen, Tillberg, and Boyden, all of MIT first described expansion microscopy as a method to enhance microscopy resolution by swelling a sample rather than using higher resolution equipment. Since then, the use of ExM has continued to grow. The novelty of the technique means that few applications have been developed. The most common use is in biological samples.

In 2016, several papers were published detailing workarounds for ExM's traditional limitation of labeling probes. These changes proposed a way to use ExM with conventional microscopy probes, allowing wider use. In 2016, these new labeling methods were applied to allow fluorescence microscopy of RNA molecules, which in turn led to spatially precise in situ sequencing, namely ExSeq (expansion sequencing), in 2021.

Even with expansion microscopy, Alzheimer's disease-related amyloid-beta plaques cannot be resolved. Boyden devised "expansion-revealing microscopy" in 2022, adding fluorescent markers after expansion instead of before. He replaced enzymes with heat. This enabled an up to 20× (8,000× by volume) expansion, without damaging proteins. It has been used to reveal synapse details, and to shed light on Alzheimer's disease, revealing occasional spirals of amyloid-beta protein around axons, which are the threadlike parts of nerve cells that carry electrical impulses.

In 2026, a preprint from the labs of Edward Boyden (MIT), Silvio Rizzoli (UMC Göttingen), and Ali H. Shaib (UMC Göttingen) reported a 1000× expansion ratio (1,000,000,000× by volume) using four sequential rounds of gel-embedding and expansion. This allowed them to solve the structure of green fluorescent protein by ExM to 11.6 Angstrom (1.16 nanometer) resolution. Instead of staining, the earlier steps used an "anchoring" process to chemically attach many parts of the GFP to the gel, followed by a protease digestion step to make sure that they become disconnected from each other. The staining came later.

=== Implosion fabrication ===
In 2018, a team at MIT showed that the expansion microscopy process could essentially be run in reverse, a process the team named implosion fabrication. In implosion fabrication, researchers create any shape and structure they want by patterning a polymer scaffold with a laser. After attaching other useful materials to the scaffold, they shrink it, generating structures one thousandth the volume of the original.

== Theory ==
Expansion microscopy is achieved by synthesizing a polymer system within a specimen. By then swelling this polymer network, the sample is expanded to be examined under conventional microscopic analysis tools without degrading the integrity of the sample. This allows a sample to be analyzed with a less powerful microscope than would be needed without expansion, and makes analysis of microscopic biological samples more accessible to labs that would otherwise have not been available to afford or obtain necessary powerful microscopy technology.

== Applications ==
=== Use ===
Expansion microscopy is a method which improves the final image resolution during regular microscopy by physically enlarging the organism, tissue, or molecule itself. After the enlargement of the organism, tissue, or molecule, more standard microscopes can achieve higher resolution imaging of smaller physiological properties. The primary fields this method is used in are those involved in analyzing biological samples with the addition of immunostaining or fluorescent dyes. Fluorescent labels are applied after expansion microscopy to make visible dense clusters of proteins and molecules. However, this technique has since been adopted into many different fields of research and continues to grow and be applied in more and more laboratory settings.

=== Disease and diagnoses ===
Before the discovery of expansion microscopy, examination of cellular structures and biomolecules were done using diffraction-limited microscopy. They were mainly used to diagnose or investigate the pathogenesis of a wide variety of predisease and disease states. However, biomolecules are nanoscale in dimension and are located with nanoscale precision throughout cells and tissues. Several techniques such as super-resolution microscopy were used, but these required complex hardware and were difficult to apply to human tissues. Thus, expansion microscopy was developed. This method physically magnified the tissue samples rather than optically, and as a result was able to produce images with high resolution. These high quality images of tissues served as a turning point in diagnostic and medical expansion microscopy.

Like many other techniques, expansion microscopy also possesses many potentials in the medical and diagnostic fields. Expansion microscopy improves the resolution of light microscopy by physically expanding the specimens. When this technique is applied to the clinical tissue samples nanoscale imaging of human tissue specimens. First, expansion pathology is used to convert clinical samples into a compatible state for the expansion microscopy. This process can be used for optical diagnosis of kidney minimal-change disease, early breast neoplastic lesions and to spot the difference of normal human tissue specimens to cancer tissue specimens, enabling a routine use of clinical research. The use of pathogenic expansion microscopy enabled clear images of tissue. Applying expansion microscopy on microarrays containing specimens from various organs, such as breast, prostate, lung, colon, pancreas, kidney, liver, and ovary, including normal and cancer-containing tissues, enabled the diagnostic and the examination of cellular network of diseased state tissues. This imaging reveals sub-diffraction limit sized features of the intermediate filaments keratin and vimentin, critical in the epithelial mesenchymal transition, cancer progression and initiation of metastasis.

In the future, after further development of this technique, observation of nanoscale morphology of biomolecules and samples from wide range of human organs is anticipated to be provided.

=== Neuroscience ===
Many of the questions surrounding neuroscience attempt to answer and understand molecules and wiring in neural circuits. However, mapping these structures across the large scales of neural circuits is difficult. In these cases, ExM magnifies biological specimens such as brain circuits and allows them to be more easily mapped. Biomolecules, such as proteins and nucleic acids, are anchored to the polymer, which is then swelled in order to expand the biomolecules. Due to the increased distance between the biomolecules, ordinary microscopes can then perform nanoscale resolution imaging. Through the use of ExM technique, neuroscientists can more easily map images of synapses, cells, and neural circuits.

== Advantages ==
One of the most significant advantages of expansion microscopy versus other forms of microscopy is that it does not require a stronger optical equipment to perform high-resolution imaging. Because ExM enlarges the physical sample, it relieves researchers from the need to purchase an expensive microscopy equipment such as electron microscopes for super-resolution studies. By expanding the sample, it becomes more easily examinable as the larger structures can then be examined using traditional microscopy techniques, such as light microscopy.

== Limitations ==
Each of the four preparation steps of ExM must fully complete, or the cell will not yield a bright and clear stain. Failure to complete these steps can result in the breaking of the cell or uneven expansion, distorting the image beyond use. ExM struggles in those procedures that use fluorophore markers, as the polymerization process can bleach these fluorophores, rendering them unusable. There are some, such as Alexa 488 and Atto 565 that are still effective after polymerization, however their efficacy is greatly decreased to about 50%. The conjugation of DNA with another antibody is often very costly and difficult. These two issues are the primary limitations to using ExM in biological samples. While rebinding new antibodies can be costly and time consuming, it is sometimes made possible, post expansion, in cases where the antibody struggles to bind in dense tissue. After expansion, the tissue is far less dense and often allows for better reception of fluorescent antibodies.

== See also ==
- Super-resolution microscopy, which may be used with ExM or independetly. Other "Ångstrom-scale" fluorescent microscopy methods include:
  - Minflux
  - Cryogenic optical localization in 3D (COLD)
  - Resolution enhancement by sequential imaging (RESI)
