= Gražvydas =

- Gender: Male
- Language: Lithuanian
- Name day: 16 April

Origin
- Region of origin: Lithuania

Gražvydas is a Lithuanian masculine given name. Individuals with the name Gražvydas include:

- Gražvydas Lukinavičius (born 1978), Lithuanian biochemist
- Gražvydas Mikulėnas (born 1973), Lithuanian footballer
