= Mary Osborn =

British molecular biologist

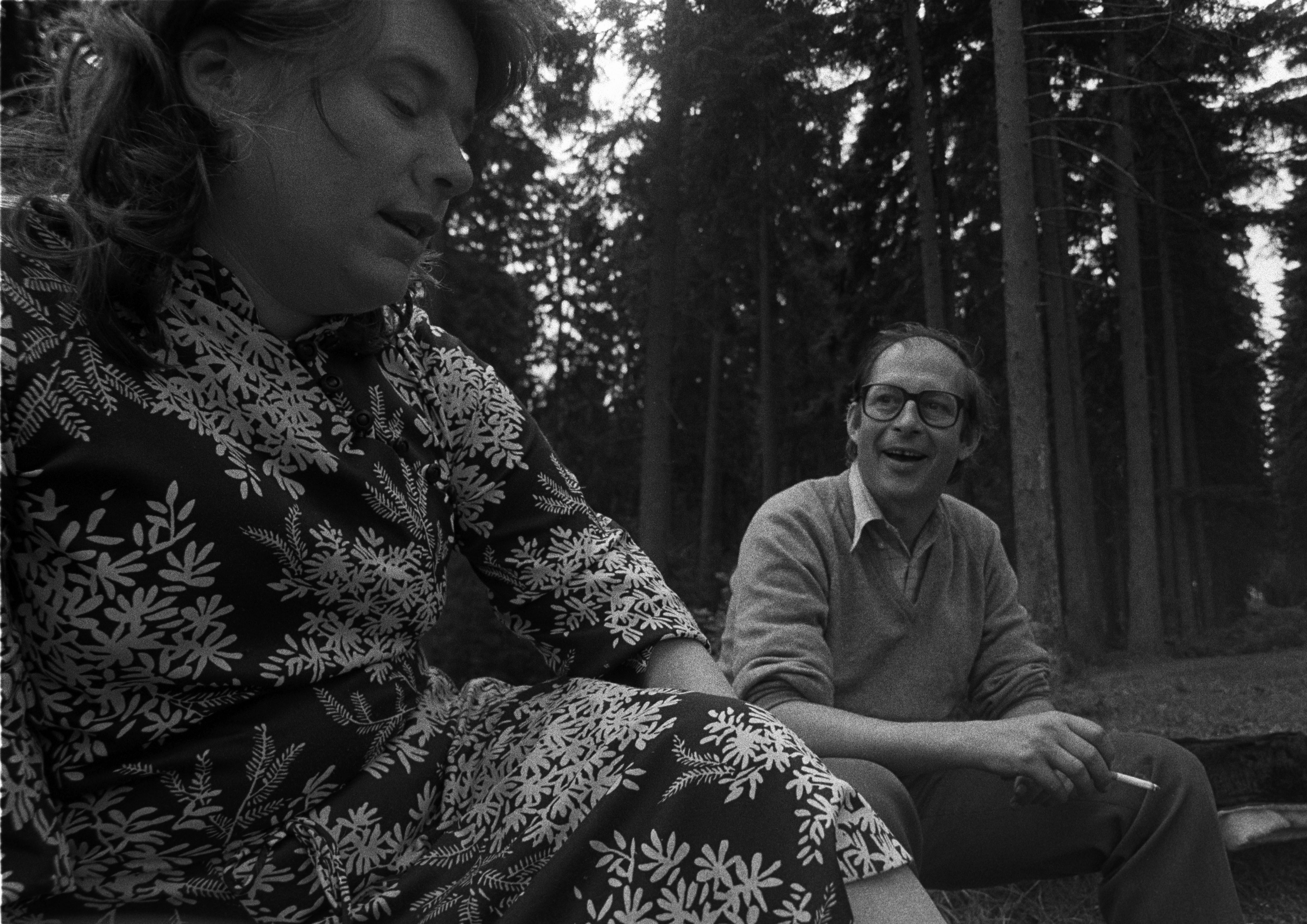
- Mary Osborn and her husband, Klaus Weber
- Born: 1940 (age 85–86); Darlington
- Education: Cheltenham Ladies' College; University of Cambridge (BA); Pennsylvania State University (PhD)
- Spouse: Klaus Weber
- Scientific career
- Workplaces: Max Planck Institute for Biophysical Chemistry; Laboratory of Molecular Biology; Harvard University; Cold Spring Harbor Laboratory
- Thesis: The Determination and Use of Mutagen Specificity in Bacteria Containing Nonsense Codons (1967)
- Doctoral advisor: Stanley Person
- Website: mpibpc.mpg.de/osborn

Mary Osborn (born in 1940) is a L'Oréal-UNESCO Women in Science Award-winning English cell biologist who, until she stopped running an active laboratory in 2005, was on the scientific staff at the Max Planck Institute for Biophysical Chemistry, Göttingen, Germany. Osborn established two techniques frequently used by cell biologists. She pioneered both molecular weight determination of proteins using SDS PAGE and immunofluorescence microscopy. Osborn also used the immunofluorescence microscopy method to work out the details of the eukaryotic cytoskeleton. Small differences in the intermediate filament constituents helped her distinguish differentiated cells from each other. She also found intermediate filament immunofluorescence differences between normal versus cancer cells. Mary Osborn has been a prominent spokesperson for women in science.

== Early life and education ==
Osborn was born in Darlington, UK on 16 December 1940. Osborn completed high school education at Cheltenham Ladies' College and university education at Newnham College, Cambridge University where she was graduated in Mathematics and Physics in 1962. She received a masters in biophysics at Pennsylvania State University in 1963. Her PhD on mutagenesis in nonsense mutations in bacteria was awarded by Pennsylvania State University in 1972.

== Research career ==
Mary Osborn carried out postdoctoral research from 1967 to 1969 in the laboratory of James Watson at Harvard University. Then she conducted research at the Laboratory of Molecular Biology, Cambridge, UK (1969–72) before moving to the Cold Spring Harbor Laboratory (1972-75.) Osborn had married her husband, Klaus Weber, on 14 July 1972. Weber and Osborn moved to the Göttingen Max Planck Institute for Biophysical Chemistry where Weber was Director and Osborn received a staff appointment in 1975. in 1989, she was appointed an honorary professor at University of Göttingen.

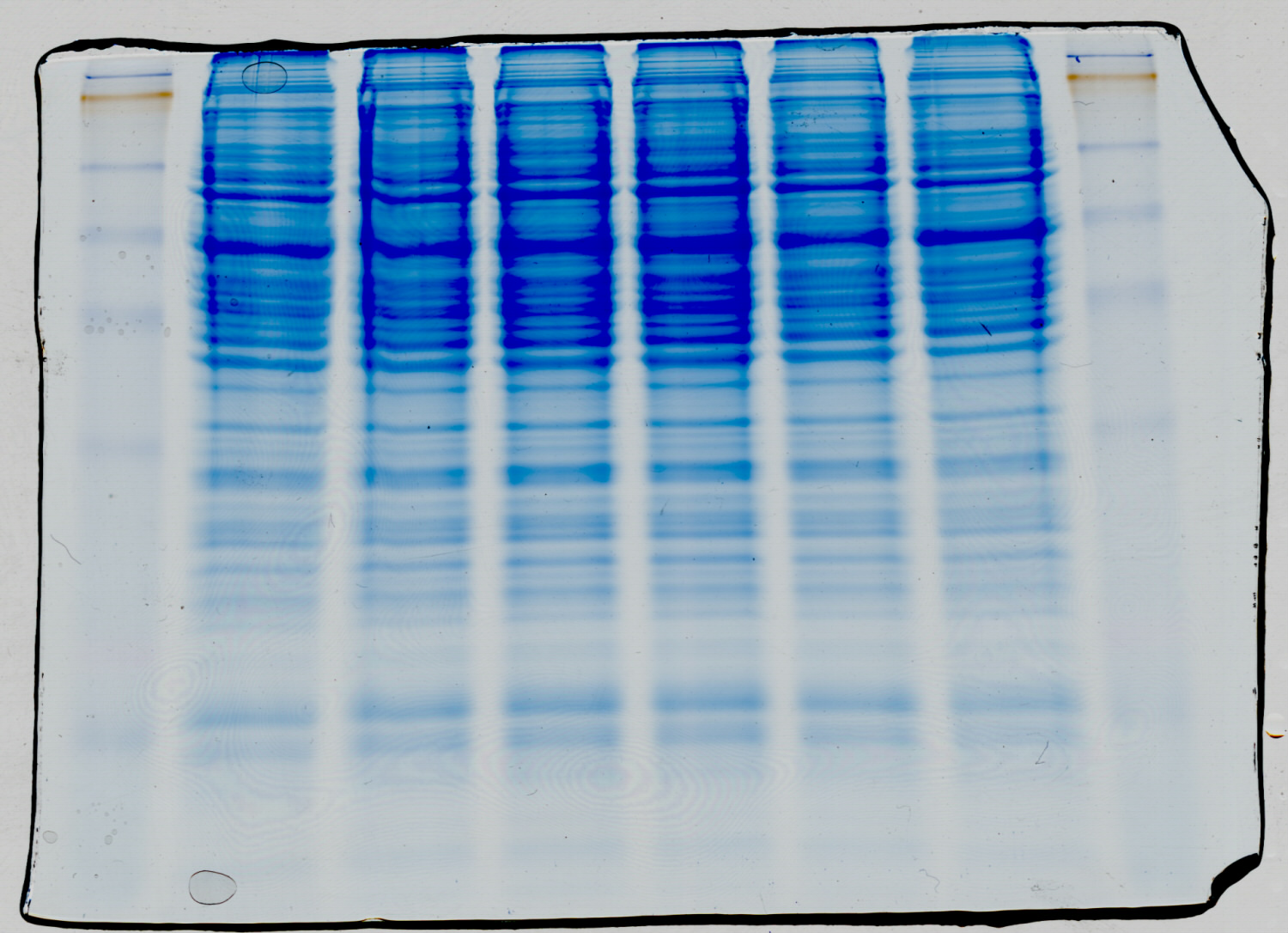
SDS-PAGE gel stained with Coomassie blue

Mary Osborn and Klaus Weber wrote a classic paper in biochemistry on determination of the molecular weight of a protein via SDS polyacrylamide gel electrophoresis, published in 1969 in Journal of Biological Chemistry. They knew that in 1967 Shapiro, Vinuela, and Maisel had shown that electrophoresis of proteins along with Sodium Dodecyl Sulfate (SDS) in polyacrylamide gels (PAGE) could separate the tested polypeptide chains by molecular weight. To see if this method applied to proteins of various sizes and shapes, Osborn and Weber took 40 known proteins, including globular and filamentous proteins, analyzed them via SDS PAGE, and plotted the logarithms of their molecular weights against their electrophoretic mobilities. The results showed convincingly that "the good resolution and the fact that an estimate of the molecular weight can be obtained within a day, together with the small amount of protein needed, makes the method strongly competitive with others commonly employed." This method has been used extensively by biochemists in all kinds of studies involving protein purification and identification as part of the process.

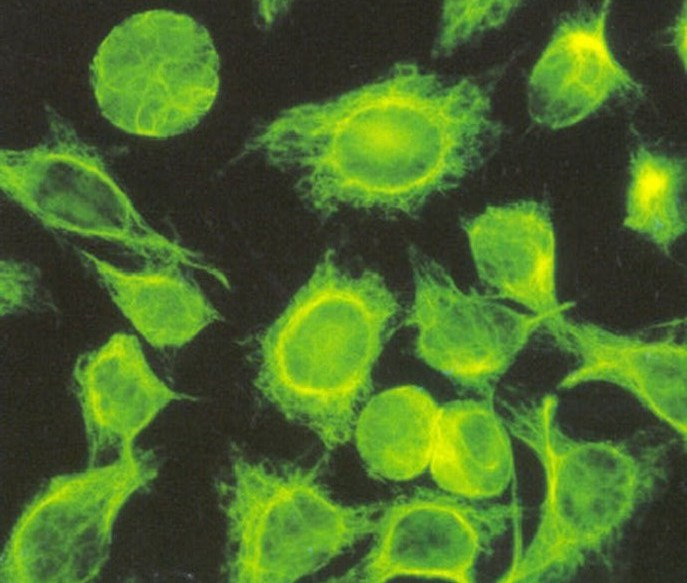
Immunofluorescence of Hep2 Intermediate Filaments

Later, Osborn and Weber pioneered fluorescent antibody staining of cellular substructures, a major technique called indirect immunofluorescence microscopy. In developing the method, they tagged microtubules with specific antibodies, then used fluorescently-tagged secondary antibodies (antibodies to the first set of antibodies) to light up the locations of the microtubules in cells. When they began their work in Germany, the cytoskeleton was not heavily researched. Microtubules and microfilaments were known, and they established that microtubules always reacted with antibodies to tubulins while microfilaments always reacted with antibodies to actin. In the course of their studies, they also found intermediate filaments, slightly thicker than microfilaments, and unreactive to actin antibodies.

They developed new antibodies against proteins of the microtubules, intermediate filaments, and microfilaments to use as reagents in examining many types of cells. Many of their antibodies have been licensed to companies for commercial development. Klaus and Osborn used their method to study elements of the cytoskeleton of eukaryotic cells in two dimensions and three dimensions. Osborn has extensively studied microtubules, intermediate filaments, microfilaments, and nuclear proteins as well as other proteins that can associate with these structures. By 1981 Osborn and Klaus had shown conclusively intermediate filaments in different types of cells are different but related, and they can be distinguished using immunofluorescence. Soon thereafter, in 1982, the laboratory showed that many tumors differ from their matching normal tissue in the protein details of intermediate filaments as shown by immunofluorescence. They also found that intermediate filament composition was tumor-specific. Osborn and Weber have pioneered the diagnostic classification of tumor types using specific cytoskeletal elements determined via immunofluorescence microscopy. Their methods have been widely applied in numerous clinical studies of muscular dystrophy and cancer.

== Support of women scientists ==
When Mary Osborn returned to Europe after years in the US, she was surprised to find that European science, technology, engineering, and mathematics (STEM fields) had not opened doors to women as she had experienced in America. She was quoted in an article in Science in 1994 to the effect that women's role in Germany was still "kinder, kuche, kirch" (children, kitchen, church.) In 1992, she had written a protest letter in response to an editorial in Nature that had claimed child care issues were chiefly responsible for the leaky pipeline for women in science, not discrimination. As a woman without children who had experienced no gender discrimination early in her career but had seen differential treatment of men and women in science later, she did not find this argument convincing, and she was appalled to find out that Europe had collected little or no data on rates of success of women in science. Partly because Osborn objected to this situation, the European Commission (EC) appointed her co-chair of a working group to investigate the status of European women scientists and scientists in training and in employment and to prepare a report. The outcome was the European Technology Assessment Network (ETAN) Report on Women in Science, published in 2006, which identified a number of reasons why women dropped out of science and served as a blueprint for Europeans who wished to fix this problem.

She noted in 2012 that there was still a leaky pipeline for women scientists in Germany. She has given a great deal of thought to how women are taught to act as they grow up and how that may impact their career decisions. In an interview in 2004, Osborn said, "In deciding whether to accept new challenges a remark by Diane Britten some years ago in The Times has proved very helpful: "When asked to do something women tend to say `Why me?' Men say `Why not me?' I have learned to say `Why not me?''' Summing up her advice to those in charge of sciences in universities and industry, she said in 2012, "Above all one has to get the argument across that it is wasteful, expensive and unfair to educate and train large numbers of woman scientists and then not use their talents in the job market or provide equal access to the top jobs."

== Awards and honors ==
- 1979 Elected member, European Molecular Biology Organization.
- 1987 Meyenburg Prize for Cancer Research.
- 1995 Elected member, Academia Europaea.
- 1997 Doctorate honoris causa, Pomeranian Medical Academy, Szczecin, Poland.
- 1998 Carl Zeiss Prize, German Society of Cell Biology, (shared with Klaus Weber).
- 1998 Helena Rubenstein / UNESCO Prize for Women in Science (UK).
- 2002 L'Oréal / UNESCO Prize for Women in Science.
- 2003-2006 President of the International Union of Biochemistry and Molecular Biology (IUBMB).
- 2005 Outstanding Science Alumni Award, Pennsylvania State University, USA.
- 2014. Federal Cross of Merit, 1st Class, Federal Republic of Germany.
- 2007 Dorothea Schlözer Medal, University of Göttingen, Germany.
