= Klaus Weber =

German scientist (1936–2016)

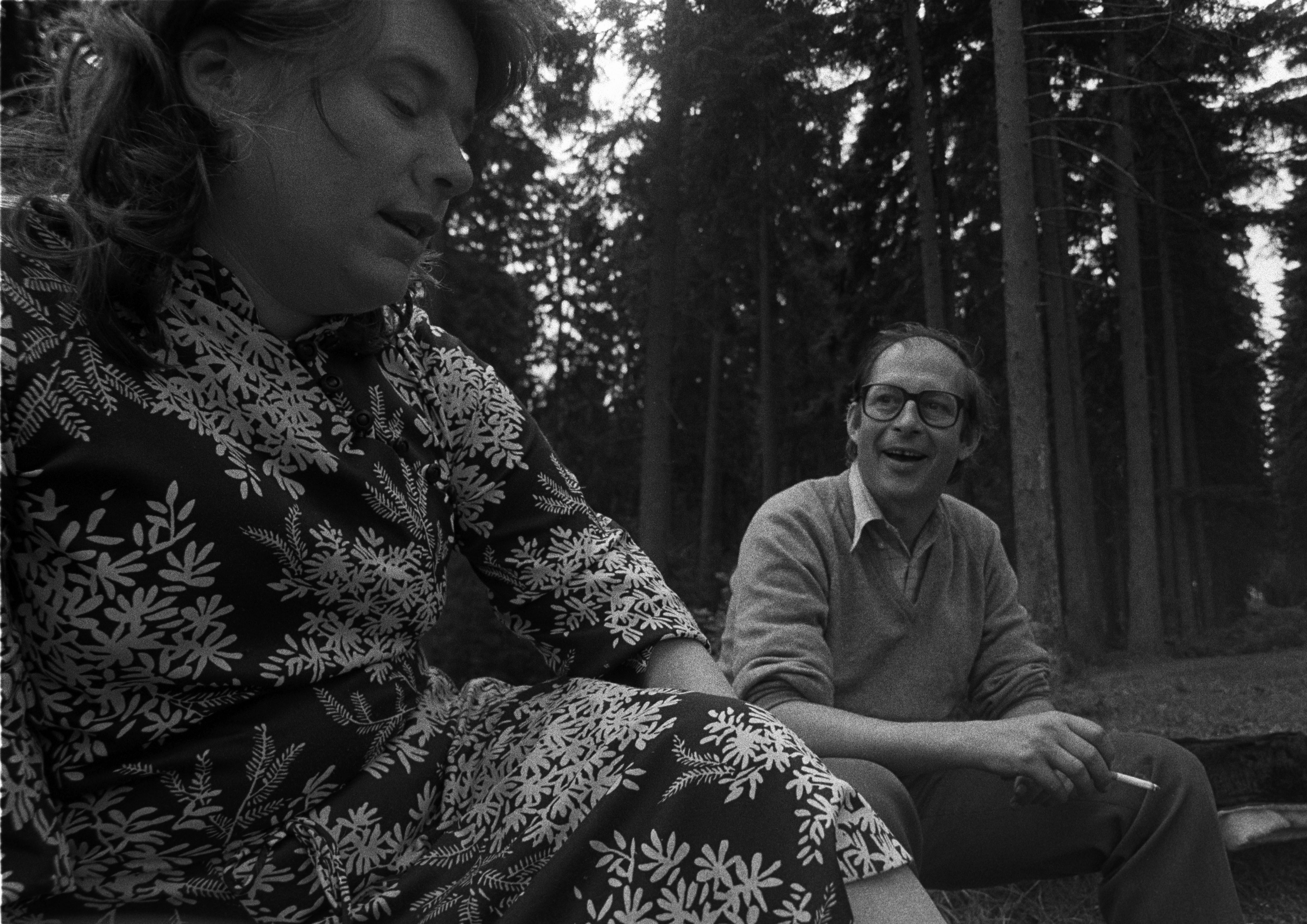
- Klaus Weber and his wife Mary Osborn in a forest in Germany in 1982. This was on one of the "Betriebsausflug" days when a company, lab or other work group basically just goes off somewhere and messes around, eating, drinking, socializing and playing games.
- Born: 5 April 1936; Łódź, Second Polish Republic
- Died: 8 August 2016 (aged 80); Göttingen, Germany
- Education: University of Freiburg
- Scientific career
- Fields: biochemistry cell biology molecular biology
- Workplaces: University of Halle; Leipzig University

Klaus Weber (5 April 1936 – 8 August 2016) was a German scientist who made many fundamentally important contributions to biochemistry, cell biology, and molecular biology, and was for many years the director of the Laboratory of Biochemistry and Cell Biology at the Max Planck Institute for Biophysical Chemistry in Göttingen, Germany. This institute has been renamed the Max Planck Institute for Multidisciplinary Sciences.

== Biography ==
Weber was born in Łódź, Poland in 1936. After earning an undergraduate degree in 1962 and a graduate degree in 1964 from the University of Freiburg, Weber came to the United States to work as a postdoctoral fellow with James D. Watson at Harvard University.

== Career ==
After a successful period as a postdoctoral fellow with Watson starting in the spring of 1965, Weber was hired as an assistant professor at Harvard and ran a joint laboratory with Watson and Walter Gilbert. During this period he worked on protein chemistry of RNA phages, but was beginning to shift his focus to animal cells and their viruses, and spent a sabbatical at Cold Spring Harbor Laboratory learning the associated techniques. Weber became a Full Professor at Harvard (1972), at the age of 36, 10 years after obtaining an undergraduate degree. His wife was Mary Osborn, who he met when he was a research fellow in the Harvard laboratory. Together they produced the "Weber and Osborn" SDS-PAGE paper, which showed that proteins could be dissolved in sodium dodecyl sulfate (SDS), reliably separated by polyacrylamide gel electrophoresis (PAGE), visualized by Coomassie brilliant blue staining, and their molecular weights determined with reasonable accuracy. The title of the paper was "The reliability of molecular weight determinations by dodecyl sulfate-polyacrylamide gel electrophoresis". This technique rapidly became standard lab practice around the world and the original paper became one of the most highly cited in the history of science. An article in the journal Nature identified the 100 most cited papers of all time and listed this paper as number 30, as of October 7, 2014, with 23,642 citations. The pair moved to Germany in 1975 when Weber was offered the position of Director of the Department of Biochemistry and Cell Biology at the Max Planck Institute for Biophysical Chemistry in Göttingen. There they pioneered another new technique: immunofluorescence microscopy. They and Elias Lazarides had previously found that they could tag the subunit proteins of microtubules, microfilaments, intermediate filaments and other cellular structures with specific antibodies and then tag these antibodies with a second fluorescently labelled antibody as described in a series of papers such as "Actin antibody: the specific visualization of actin filaments in non-muscle cells". The fluorescent signal could be easily visualized using a fluorescence microscope and this allowed the rapid examination of the localization of molecules in cells and in tissues. This technique has also become a routine part of lab practice all around the world.

He was a coauthor on a third fundamentally important research report showing that RNA interference could be routinely used to "knock down" the expression of major cellular proteins, work he performed with Thomas Tuschl and collaborators. A few weeks work in Weber's lab produced the highly influential paper "Duplexes of 21-nucleotide RNAs mediate RNA interference in cultured mammalian cells". This paper set the stage for the widespread use of RNA interference to turn off the expression of normal genes in mammalian systems, a centrally important cell biological technique. In summary, he contributed to the development of three of the most important and routinely used lab techniques. Among his other achievements are several hundred well-cited studies concentrating mostly on the biochemistry and function of the cellular cytoskeleton.

In 1984 he, along with George Gee Jackson and Werner Franke, won the Ernst Jung Prize for excellence in biomedical sciences. He won the Otto Warburg Medal from the German Society for Biochemistry and Molecular Biology in 1997, and the Carl Zeiss Prize from the German Society of Cell Biology, which he shared with Osborn in 1998. Weber served on the Editorial Boards of Cell, EMBO Journal, Experimental Cell Research, the European Journal of Cell Biology, and Mechanisms of Development. Weber retired in 2004, and was an emeritus professor at the Max Planck Institute for Biophysical Chemistry. Although retired, he was still contributing to the scientific literature until his death on 8 August 2016.
