= Diaspro =

Diaspro may refer to:

- Alberto Diaspro, scientist
- Diaspro (submarine), Italian coastal submarine of the Perla class
- Diaspro, see List of Winx Club characters
