= Max Planck Institute for Experimental Medicine =

German research institute

Coordinates: 51°33′4″N 9°56′14″E

Max Planck Institute of Experimental Medicine
- Max-Planck-Institut für Experimentelle Medizin
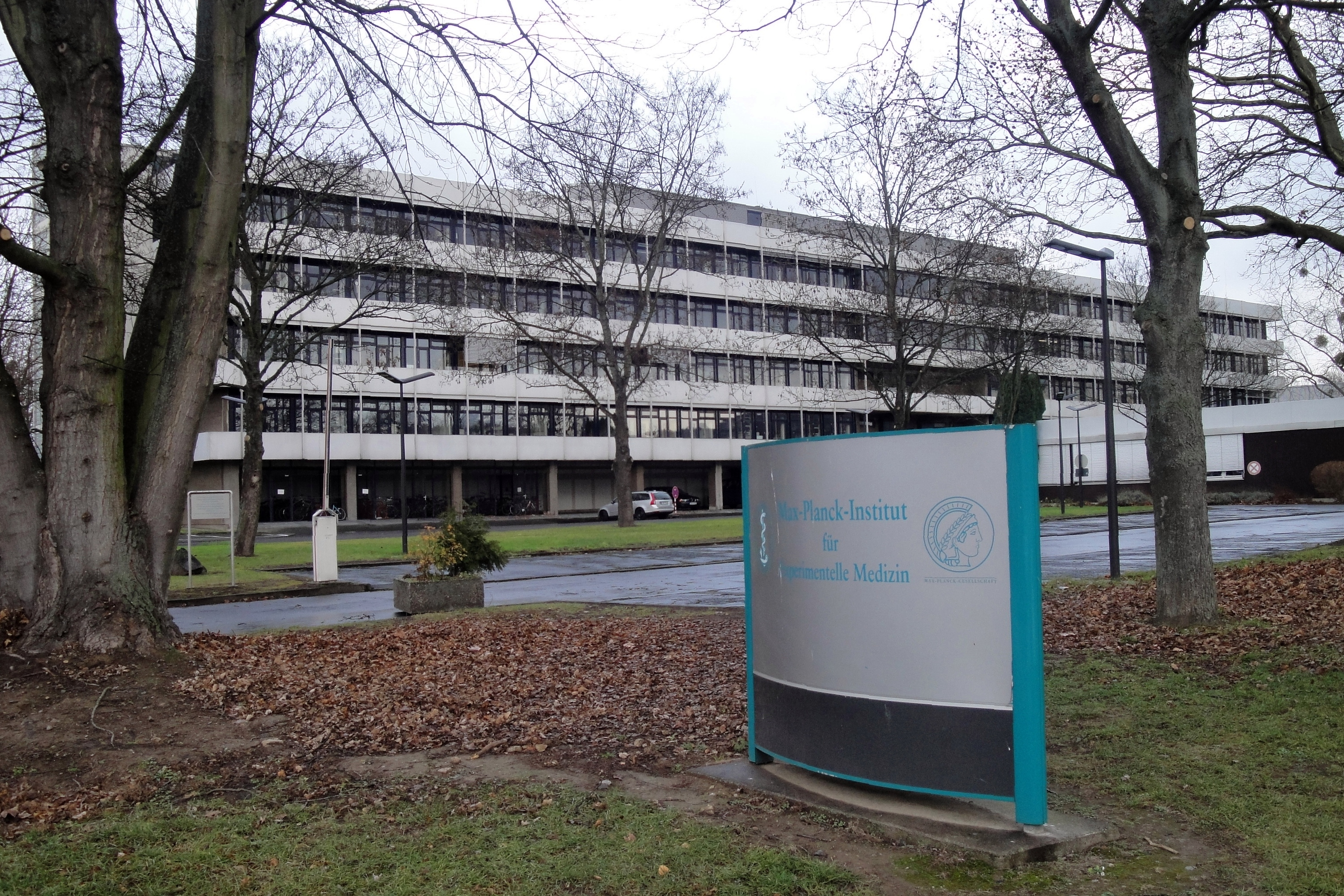
- Abbreviation: MPIEM
- Predecessor: Kaiser Wilhelm Institute for Medical Research
- Successor: Max Planck Institute for Multidisciplinary Sciences
- Formation: 1947; 79 years ago
- Type: Scientific institute
- Legal status: Underwent merger with the Max Planck Institute for Biophysical Chemistry
- Purpose: Research on experimental medicine in neuroscience
- Headquarters: Göttingen, Lower Saxony, Germany
- Parent organization: Max Planck Society
- Formerly called: Medical Research Institution of the Kaiser Wilhelm Society

The Max Planck Institute of Experimental Medicine (German: Max-Planck-Institut für Experimentelle Medizin) was a research institute of the Max Planck Society, located in Göttingen, Germany. On January 1, 2022, the institute merged with the Max Planck Institute for Biophysical Chemistry in Göttingen to form the Max Planck Institute for Multidisciplinary Sciences.

It was founded in 1947 as the Medical Research Institution of the Kaiser Wilhelm Society (German: Medizinische Forschungsanstalt der Kaiser-Wilhelm-Gesellschaft), and was integrated into the Max Planck Society in 1948. It retained its original name until 1965. The research focus of the institute was on neuroscience: its research activities were organized into the Department of Neurogenetics, the Department of Molecular Neurobiology, and the Department of Molecular Biology of Neuron Signals.

== Research ==
The institute's research activities in the area of neuroscience covered a wide spectrum of topics, ranging from basic molecular analyses of neuronal processes to clinical studies on novel therapies of neurological and psychiatric disorders in patients. The central aim of the studies was to understand basic molecular and cellular processes in brain function, to analyze their pathological dysfunction in psychiatric and neurological diseases, and ultimately to develop novel therapies for these disorders.

== Departments ==
=== Neurogenetics ===
The Department of Neurogenetics, led by Klaus-Armin Nave, uses transgenic techniques, natural and engineered mouse mutants and the tools of molecular and cellular biology to study neural development and the pathomechanisms of neurodegenerative diseases. A major focus of their research is on neuron-glia interactions that result in the assembly of myelin in the nervous system. Neuronal processes (axons) exhibit signaling molecules that are recognized by Schwann cells and oligodendrocytes. These highly specialized glial cells wrap and electrically insulate axons in the peripheral and central nervous system, respectively. Myelin allows the fast propagation of electrical impulses, but glial cells are also required for axonal maintenance. This line of research helps us to understand the molecular mechanisms of human neurological diseases in which genetic mutations cause myelin loss and defects of motor and cognitive function.

=== Molecular Neurobiology ===
The Department of Molecular Neurobiology, led by Nils Brose, focuses on molecular mechanisms of synapse development and function in the mammalian central nervous system. For that purpose, Molecular Neurobiology is combining protein biochemical, yeast genetic, cell biological, electrophysiological and morphological methods with mouse genetics to identify and characterize key molecules with functional roles in synaptogenesis, presynaptic neurotransmitter release and postsynaptic signal transduction pathways. The final aim of these studies is a detailed molecular understanding of synaptogenesis and synaptic transmission, which in turn will be useful for the design of therapeutic strategies for neurological and psychiatric diseases that involve synaptic dysfunction.

=== Molecular Biology of Neuronal Signals ===
The Department of Molecular Biology of Neuron Signals, led by Walter Stühmer, investigates on structure-function relationships of native and genetically modified ion channels, on origin and distribution as well as on genetic and physiological regulation of expression of different ion channels and membrane proteins through in situ and in vitro methods. By combination of Total Internal Reflection Fluorescence Microscopy (TIRFM) with Fluorescence Resonance Energy Transfer (FRET) methods protein interactions at cell membranes are studied. In the focus of the research team is the analysis of physiological functions of ion channels during neuronal interactions and development and during cancerogenesis.
