= Marina Bennati =

German physicist

- Education: University of Stuttgart; University of Münster
- Scientific career
- Workplaces: Max Planck Institute for Multidisciplinary Sciences; University of Göttingen; Goethe University Frankfurt; Massachusetts Institute of Technology
- Thesis: Zeitaufgelöste Elektronen-Spin-Resonanz an photoangeregten Zuständen spezieller Donor-Akzeptor-Systeme (1995)

Marina Bennati is a German physicist who is a professor at the University of Göttingen and the leader of research group ESR spectroscopy at the Max Planck Institute for Multidisciplinary Sciences. Her research is focused on the development of high-field electron paramagnetic resonance spectroscopy for the characterisation of biomolecules and the methods of high-field dynamic nuclear polarization for the sensitivity enhancement of nuclear magnetic resonance.

== Early life and education ==
Bennati started her scientific career in chemistry, earning a bachelor's degree at the University of Münster. Bennati earned her doctorate in physics at the University of Stuttgart. She moved to Massachusetts Institute of Technology as a German Research Foundation postdoctoral fellow. In 1999 she was promoted to staff research associate.

== Research and career ==
Bennati returned to Germany in 2002, where she was made a lecturer at the Goethe University Frankfurt and awarded the International EPR Society Young Investigator award. She moved to the University of Göttingen in 2007, where she started a research group in electron paramagnetic resonance (EPR) spectroscopy. In particular, Bennati demonstrated that EPR can be used to study biomolecular structures such as ribonucleotide reductase. She has used electron nuclear double resonance to establish the orientation and distance of nuclear spins with respect to a paramagnetic centre. In biological processes, paramagnetic centres exist as metal ions or clusters. She has shown that pulsed EPR is sensitive to the interactions between unpaired electron spins.

In 2012, Bennati was made Chair of the German Research Foundation program "New Frontiers in Sensitivity for EPR Spectroscopy: from Biological Cells to Nano Materials". The program looked to increase the sensitivity of electron paramagnetic resonance spectroscopy, offering hope for the characterization of light degradation in photovoltaics and in vivo protein-protein interactions. To achieve this enhancement in sensitivity, Bennati worked on both the excitation and detection devices. In 2019, Bennati was awarded the Bruker prize for her outstanding work that spans not just ESR but also the neighbouring disciplines of NMR and DNP. She was awarded a European Research Council Advanced Grant in 2021. She was awarded the international EPR societies silver medal for her fundamental contributions to advance the physics of electron-nuclear double resonance (ENDOR) and liquid-state dynamic nuclear polarization (DNP) spectroscopy at high magnetic fields, and their application for the study of paramagnetic molecular systems.

== Selected publications ==
- Mikulec, Frederic V.; Kuno, Masaru; Bennati, Marina; Hall, Dennis A.; Griffin, Robert G.; Bawendi, Moungi G. (1999). "Organometallic Synthesis and Spectroscopic Characterization of Manganese Doped CdSe Nanocrystals". MRS Proceedings. 582 H2.4. doi:10.1557/proc-582-h2.4. hdl:11858/00-001M-0000-002C-9F65-4. ISSN 0272-9172.
- C Griesinger; M Bennati; Hans-Martin Vieth; et al. (4 November 2011). "Dynamic nuclear polarization at high magnetic fields in liquids". Progress in Nuclear Magnetic Resonance Spectroscopy. 64: 4–28. doi:10.1016/j.pnmrs.2011.10.002. ISSN 0079-6565. PMID 22578315. Wikidata Q38009411.
- V P Denysenkov; Thomas F Prisner; J Stubbe; M Bennati (28 August 2006). "High-field pulsed electron-electron double resonance spectroscopy to determine the orientation of the tyrosyl radicals in ribonucleotide reductase". Proceedings of the National Academy of Sciences of the United States of America. 103 (36): 13386–13390. Bibcode:2006PNAS..10313386D. doi:10.1073/pnas.0605851103. ISSN 0027-8424. PMC 1569173. PMID 16938868. Wikidata Q35037255.
