= GSD microscopy =

Method of microscopy

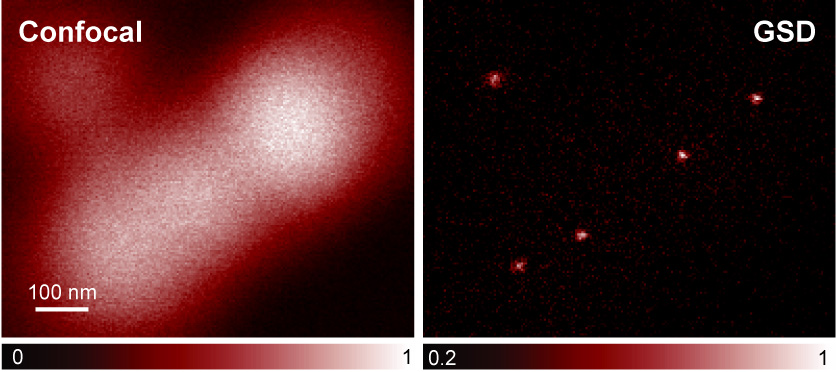
Comparison of resolution between standard confocal microscopy and GSD microscopy. Left: Confocal recording of vacancies in diamonds. Single spots cannot be separated. Right: GSD recording of the same location. Single vacancies are clearly visible. The size of the pointlike vacancies, corresponding to the microscope's resolution, is about 15 nm.

Ground state depletion microscopy (GSD microscopy) is an implementation of the RESOLFT concept. The method was proposed in 1995 and experimentally demonstrated in 2007. It is the second concept to overcome the diffraction barrier in far-field optical microscopy published by Stefan Hell. Using nitrogen-vacancy centers in diamonds a resolution of up to 7.8 nm was achieved in 2009. This is far below the diffraction limit (~200 nm).

== Principle ==
In GSD microscopy, fluorescent markers are used. In one condition, the marker can freely be excited from ground state and returns spontaneously via emission of a fluorescence photon. However, if light of appropriate wavelength is additionally applied the dye can be excited to a long-lived dark state, i.e. a state where no fluorescence occurs. As long as the molecule is in the long-lived dark state (e.g. a triplet state), it cannot be excited from the ground state. Switching between these two states (bright and dark) by applying light fulfills all preconditions for the RESOLFT concept and subwavelength scale imaging, and therefore images with very high resolution can be obtained. For successful implementation, GSD microscopy requires either special fluorophores with high triplet yield, or removal of oxygen by use of various mounting media such as Mowiol or Vectashield.

The implementation in a microscope is very similar to stimulated emission depletion microscopy, however it can operate with only one wavelength for excitation and depletion. Using an appropriate ring-like focal spot for the light that switches the molecules into the dark state, the fluorescence can be quenched at the outer part of the focal spot. Therefore, fluorescence only still takes place at the center of the microscope's focal spot and the spatial resolution is increased.
