= 4Pi microscope =

A 4Pi microscope is a laser scanning fluorescence microscope with an improved axial resolution. With it the typical range of the axial resolution of 500–700 nm can be improved to 100–150 nm, which corresponds to an almost spherical focal spot with 5–7 times less volume than that of standard confocal microscopy.

== Working principle ==
The improvement in resolution is achieved by using two opposing objective lenses, which both are focused to the same geometrical location. Also the difference in optical path length through each of the two objective lenses is carefully aligned to be minimal. By this method, molecules residing in the common focal area of both objectives can be illuminated coherently from both sides and the reflected or emitted light can also be collected coherently, i.e. coherent superposition of emitted light on the detector is possible. The solid angle $\Omega$ that is used for illumination and detection is increased and approaches its maximum. In this case the sample is illuminated and detected from all sides simultaneously.

Optical Scheme of 4Pi Microscope

The operation mode of a 4Pi microscope is shown in the figure. The laser light is divided by a beam splitter and directed by mirrors towards the two opposing objective lenses. At the common focal point superposition of both focused light beams occurs. Excited molecules at this position emit fluorescence light, which is collected by both objective lenses, combined by the same beam splitter and deflected by a dichroic mirror onto a detector. There, superposition of both emitted light pathways can take place again.

In the ideal case each objective lens can collect light from a solid angle of $\Omega=2\pi$. With two objective lenses one can collect from every direction (solid angle $\Omega=4\pi$). The name of this type of microscopy is derived from the maximal possible solid angle for excitation and detection. Practically, one can achieve only aperture angles of about 140° for an objective lens, which corresponds to $\Omega \approx 1.3\pi$.

The microscope can be operated in three different ways: In a 4Pi microscope of type A, the coherent superposition of excitation light is used to generate the increased resolution. The emission light is either detected from one side only or in an incoherent superposition from both sides. In a 4Pi microscope of type B, only the emission light is interfering. When operated in the type C mode, both excitation and emission light are allowed to interfere, leading to the highest possible resolution increase (~7-fold along the optical axis as compared to confocal microscopy).

In a real 4Pi microscope light cannot be applied or collected from all directions equally, leading to so-called side lobes in the point spread function. Typically (but not always) two-photon excitation microscopy is used in a 4Pi microscope in combination with an emission pinhole to lower these side lobes to a tolerable level.

== History ==
In 1971, Christoph Cremer and Thomas Cremer proposed the creation of a perfect hologram, i.e. one that carries the whole field information of the emission of a point source in all directions, a so-called $4\pi$ hologram. However the publication from 1978 had drawn an improper physical conclusion (i.e. a point-like spot of light) and had completely missed the axial resolution increase as the actual benefit of adding the other side of the solid angle. The first description of a practicable system of 4Pi microscopy, i.e. the setup with two opposing, interfering lenses, was invented by Stefan Hell in 1991. He demonstrated it experimentally in 1994.

In the following years, the number of applications for this microscope has grown. For example, parallel excitation and detection with 64 spots in the sample simultaneously combined with the improved spatial resolution resulted in the successful recording of the dynamics of mitochondria in yeast cells with a 4Pi microscope in 2002. A commercial version was launched by microscope manufacturer Leica Microsystems in 2004 and later discontinued.

Up to now, the best quality in a 4Pi microscope was reached in conjunction with super-resolution techniques like the stimulated emission depletion (STED) principle. Using a 4Pi microscope with appropriate excitation and de-excitation beams, it was possible to create a uniformly 50 nm sized spot, which corresponds to a decreased focal volume compared to confocal microscopy by a factor of 150–200 in fixed cells. With the combination of 4Pi microscopy and RESOLFT microscopy with switchable proteins, it is now possible to take images of living cells at low light levels with isotropic resolutions below 40 nm.

== See also ==
- Stimulated emission depletion microscope (STED)
- Multifocal plane microscopy (MUM)
