= Minflux =

Principle and applications of MINFLUX microscopy

MINFLUX, or minimal fluorescence photon fluxes microscopy, is a super-resolution light microscopy method that images and tracks objects in two and three dimensions with single-digit nanometer resolution.

MINFLUX uses a structured excitation beam with at least one intensity minimum – typically a doughnut-shaped beam with a central intensity zero – to elicit photon emission from a fluorophore. The position of the excitation beam is controlled with sub-nanometer precision, and when the intensity zero is positioned exactly on the fluorophore, the system records no emission. Thus, the system requires few emitted photons to determine the fluorophore's location with high precision. In practice, overlapping the intensity zero and the fluorophore would require a priori location knowledge to position the beam. As this is not the case, the excitation beam is moved around in a defined pattern to probe the emission from the fluorophore near the intensity minimum.

Each localization takes less than 5 microseconds, so MINFLUX can construct images of nanometric structures or track single molecules in fixed and live specimens by pooling the locations of fluorescent labels. Because the goal is to locate the point where a fluorophore stops emitting, MINFLUX significantly reduces the number of fluorescence photons needed for localization compared to other methods.

A commercial MINFLUX system is available from abberior instruments GmbH.

== Principle ==
MINFLUX overcomes the Abbe diffraction limit in light microscopy and distinguishes individual fluorescing molecules by leveraging the photophysical properties of fluorophores. The system temporarily silences (sets in an OFF-state) all but one molecule within a diffraction-limited area (DLA) and then locates that single active (in an ON-state) molecule. Super-resolution microscopy techniques like stochastic optical reconstruction microscopy (STORM) and photoactivated localization microscopy (PALM) do the same. However, MINFLUX differs in how it determines the molecule's location.

The excitation beam used in MINFLUX has a local intensity minimum or intensity zero. The position of this intensity zero in a sample is adjusted via control electronics and actuators with sub-nanometer spatial and sub-microsecond temporal precision. When the active molecule located at $\vec{r}_m$ is in a non-zero intensity area of the excitation beam, it fluoresces. The number of photons $n$ emitted by the active molecule is proportional to the excitation beam intensity at that position.

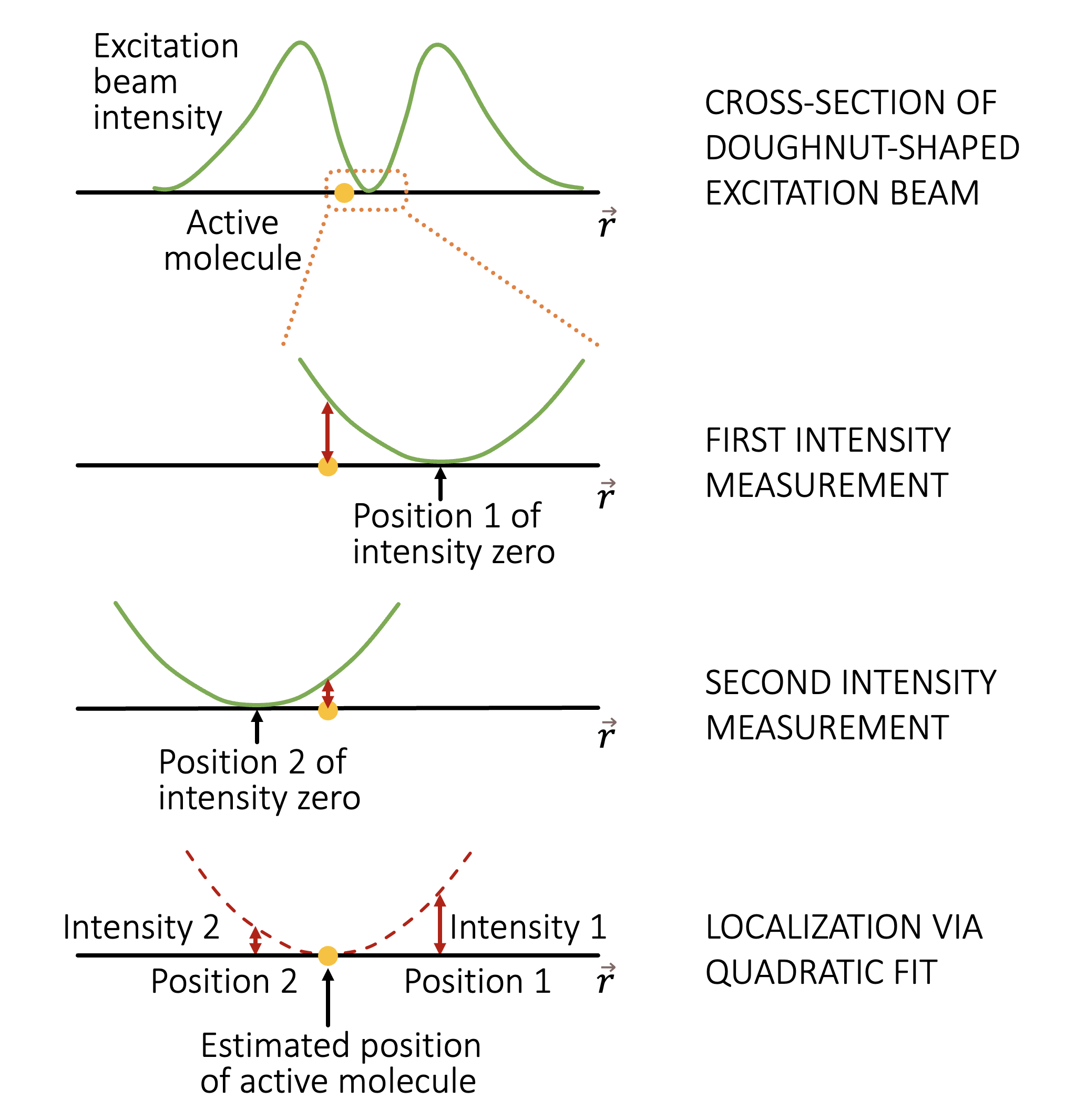
When an active fluorescent molecule is in the vicinity of the intensity zero of the MINFLUX excitation beam, the number of photons it emits is proportional to the intensity of the excitation beam at that position. The intensity of that emission can be approximated by a quadratic function. In this one-dimensional diagram, recording photon emission with the excitation beam at two different positions enables estimating the intensity minimum between the two points, corresponding to the active molecule's estimated position.

In the vicinity of the excitation beam intensity zero, the intensity $I$ of the emission from the active molecule when the intensity zero is located at position $\vec{r}$ can be approximated by a quadratic function. Therefore, the recorded number of emission photons is:

$n(\vec{r},\vec{r}_m) = cI = c(\vec{r}-\vec{r}_m)^2$

where $c$ is a measure of the collection efficiency of detection, the absorption cross-section of the emitter, and the quantum yield of fluorescence.

In other words, photon fluxes emitted by the active molecule when it is located close to the zero-intensity point of the excitation beam carry information about its distance to the center of the beam. That information can be used to find the position of the active molecule. The position is probed with a set of $K$ excitation intensities $\{I_0, ..., I_{K-1}\}$. For example, the active molecule is excited with the same doughnut-shaped beam moved to different positions. The probing results in a corresponding set of photon counts $\{n_0, ..., n_{K-1}\}$. These photon counts are probabilistic; each time such a set is measured, the result is a different realization of photon numbers fluctuating around a mean value. Since their distribution follows Poissonian statistics, the expected position of the active molecule can be estimated from the photon numbers, using, for example, a maximum likelihood estimation of the form:

$\widehat{\vec{r}_m} = argmax \mathcal{L} (\vec{r}\mid\{n_0, ..., n_{K-1}\})$

The position $\widehat{\vec{r}_m}$ maximizes the likelihood that the measured set of photon counts occurred exactly as recorded and is thus, an estimate of the active molecule's location.

== Localization process ==
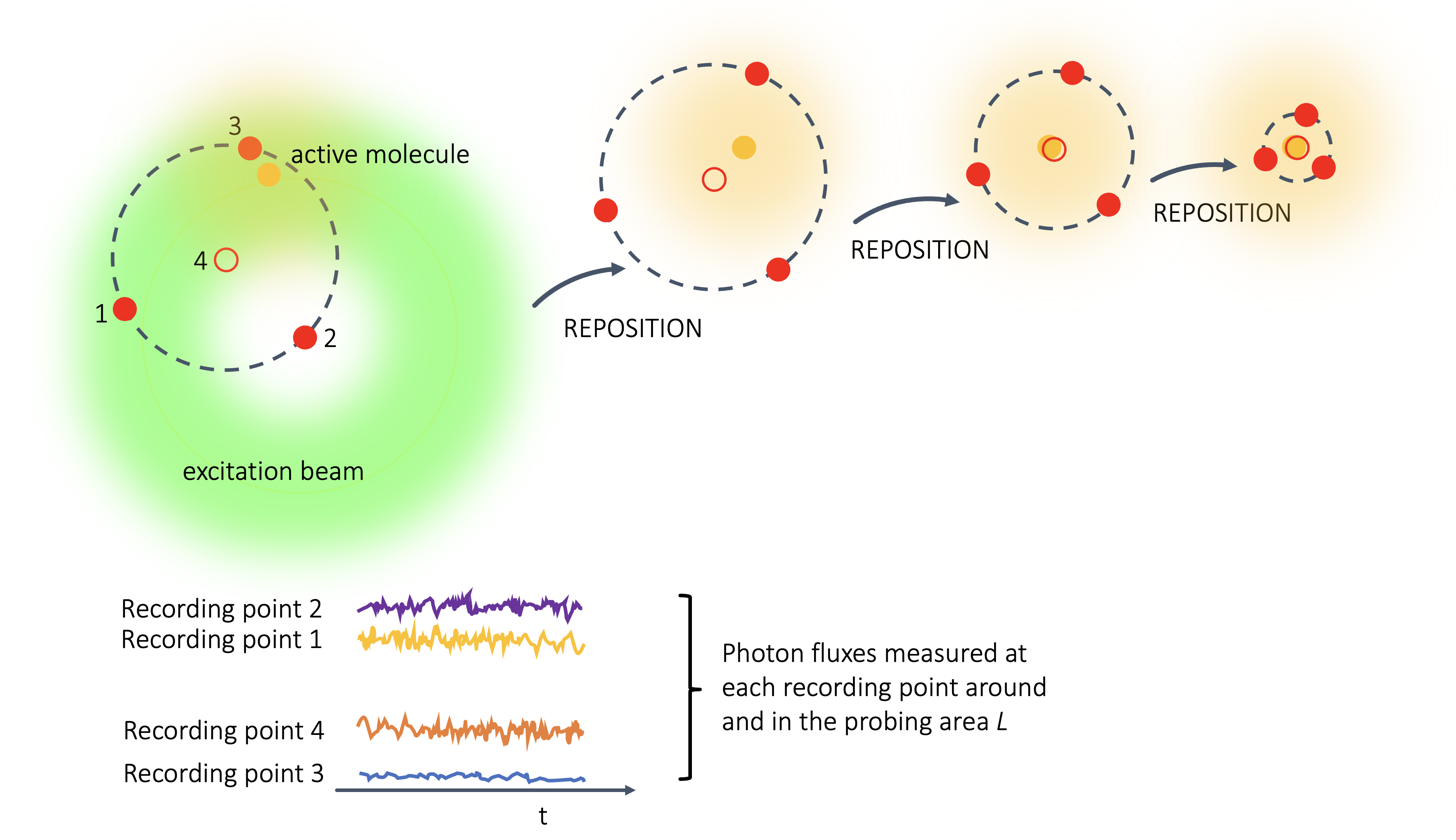
MINFLUX localizes an active fluorescent molecule using a probing scheme. The doughnut-shaped excitation beam is positioned at different points at the periphery and in the middle of a probing area L. The active molecule is excited at each position, and photon fluxes are recorded. MINFLUX uses the flux patterns of these recordings to reposition the excitation beam to center on the active molecule and then performs another probing iteration. With each iteration, the probing area L is constricted, and the intensity zero of the excitation beam more accurately overlaps with the position of the active molecule.

Recordings of the emitting active molecule at two different excitation beam positions are needed to use the quadratic approximation in the one-dimensional basic principle described above. Each recording provides a one-dimensional distance value to the center of the excitation beam. In two dimensions, at least three recording points are needed to ascertain a location that can be used to move the MINFLUX excitation beam toward the target molecule. These recording points demarcate a probing area and the Cramér-Rao limit is used to show that constricting this probing area significantly improves localization precision, more so than increasing the number of emitted photons:

$\sigma_B \propto \frac{L}{\sqrt{N}}$

where $\sigma_B$ is the Cramér-Rao limit, $L$ is the diameter of the probing area, and $N$ is the number of emitted photons.

MINFLUX takes advantage of this feature when localizing an active fluorophore. It records photon fluxes using a probing scheme of at least three recording points around the probing area $L$ and one point at the center. These fluxes differ at each recording point as the active molecule is excited by different light intensities. Those flux patterns inform the repositioning of the probing area to center on the active molecule. Then the probing process is repeated. With each probing iteration, MINFLUX constricts the probing area $L$, narrowing the space where the active molecule can be located. Thus, the distance remaining between the intensity zero and the active molecule is determined more precisely at each iteration. The steadily improving positional information minimizes the number of fluorescence photons and the time that MINFLUX needs to achieve precise localizations.

== Applications ==
By pooling the determined locations of multiple fluorescent molecules in a specimen, MINFLUX generates images of nanoscopic structures with a resolution of 1–3 nm. MINFLUX has been used to image DNA origami and the nuclear pore complex and to elucidate the architecture of subcellular structures in mitochondria and photoreceptors. Because MINFLUX does not collect large numbers of photons emitted from target molecules, localization is faster than with conventional camera-based systems. Thus, MINFLUX can iteratively localize the same molecule at microsecond intervals over a defined period. MINFLUX has been used to track the movement of the motor protein kinesin-1, both in vitro and in vivo, and to monitor configurational changes of the mechanosensitive ion channel PIEZO1.

== See also ==
- Confocal microscopy
- Fluorescence
- Fluorescence microscope
- Fluorescence resonance energy transfer microscopy
- Laser scanning confocal microscopy
- Optical microscopy
- Photoactivated localization microscopy
- Stochastic optical reconstruction microscopy
- Super-resolution microscopy
- Ground state depletion microscopy
- RESOLFT
