= Max Planck Institute for Biophysical Chemistry =

Research institute in Germany

Max Planck Institute for Biophysical Chemistry (Karl-Friedrich Bonhoeffer Institute)
- Max-Planck-Institut für biophysikalische Chemie (Karl-Friedrich-Bonhoeffer-Institut)
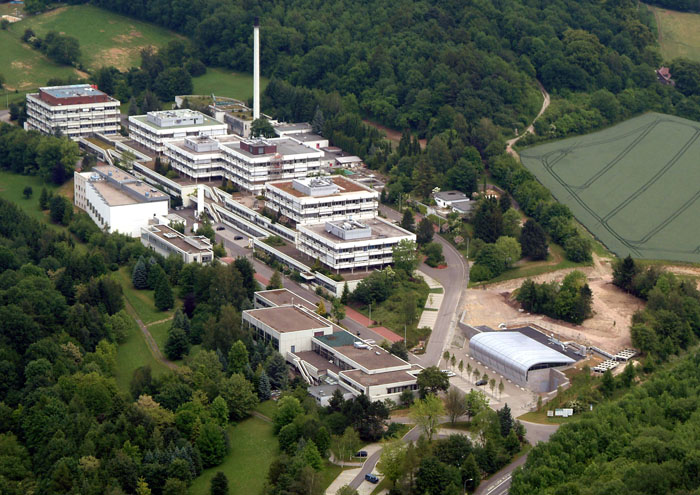
- Aerial photograph of the institute
- Predecessor: MPI for Physical Chemistry; MPI for Spectroscopy
- Successor: Max Planck Institute for Multidisciplinary Sciences
- Formation: 1971; 55 years ago
- Type: Scientific institute
- Legal status: Merged with the Max Planck Institute for Experimental Medicine
- Purpose: Research in biophysical chemistry
- Headquarters: Göttingen, Lower Saxony, Germany
- Parent organization: Max Planck Society

The Max Planck Institute for Biophysical Chemistry (German: Max-Planck-Institut für biophysikalische Chemie), also known as the Karl-Friedrich Bonhoeffer Institute (German: Karl-Friedrich-Bonhoeffer-Institut), was a research institute of the Max Planck Society, located in Göttingen, Germany. On January 1, 2022, the institute merged with the Max Planck Institute for Experimental Medicine in Göttingen to form the Max Planck Institute for Multidisciplinary Sciences.

This was the only Max Planck Institute (MPI) that combined the three classical scientific disciplines – biology, physics and chemistry. Founded in 1971, its initial focus was on problems in physics in chemistry. It had undergone a continuous evolution manifested through an expanding range of core subjects and work areas such as neurobiology, biochemistry, and molecular biology. At the time of merger, 850 people worked at the institute, about half of them scientists. Four researchers working at the institute – Stefan Hell, 2014; Erwin Neher and Bert Sakmann, 1991; and Manfred Eigen, 1967 – were awarded the Nobel Prize.

== History ==
The origins of the institute date to 1949. At that time, the Max Planck Society established the MPI for Physical Chemistry in Göttingen as a follow-up to the former Kaiser Wilhelm Institute for Physical Chemistry in Berlin. Karl-Friedrich Bonhoeffer, who had worked at the Kaiser Wilhelm Institute, became the founding director of the new institute. He was one of the first researchers who applied physical-chemical methods in biological research and thus combined different disciplines of natural sciences in research.

In 1971, the MPI for Physical Chemistry merged with the MPI for Spectroscopy (also in Göttingen), forming the MPI for Biophysical Chemistry. This was mainly initiated by Nobel Prize laureate Manfred Eigen, director of the MPI for Physical Chemistry. His vision of an interdisciplinary approach to biological research was decisive and the creative impulse for the development of the institute. In honour of Karl Friedrich Bonhoeffer, the new institute was named after him.

Although the institute was dedicated to basic research – by virtue of the charter of the Max Planck Society – its policy was to encourage the transfer of numerous technological innovations to the marketplace. As a consequence, many licensing agreements and start-up firms arose from research conducted at the institute, e. g. Lambda Physik (today part of Coherent), DeveloGen (today part of Evotec) and Evotec.

== Research ==
=== Research focus ===
Research at the institute focuses on the fundamental mechanisms that regulate and control life processes: How is genetic information correctly translated into proteins? How do nerve cells communicate with each other? How is cellular logistics controlled? On the organismal level, researchers at the institute study the circadian rhythms of the vertebrate, or differentiation and development in multicellular organisms.

To obtain even deeper insights into the nanocosmos of living cells, the institute employs ultra-high resolution microscopy, nuclear magnetic resonance spectroscopy and tomography, mass spectrometry, optical spectroscopy, or atomistic computer simulations. At the same time, the institute concentrates on developing novel measurement and analysis methods to provide a closer look into the world of molecules.

=== Departments ===
The Max Planck Institute for Biophysical Chemistry currently encompasses 12 departments:

- Nils Brose – Molecular Neurobiology
- Patrick Cramer – Molecular Biology
- Dirk Görlich – Cellular Logistics
- Christian Griesinger – NMR-based Structural Biology
- Helmut Grubmüller – Theoretical and Computational Biophysics
- Stefan W. Hell – NanoBiophotonics
- Jochen Rink – Tissue Dynamics and Regeneration
- Marina Rodnina – Physical Biochemistry
- Claus Ropers – Ultrafast Dynamics
- Melina Schuh – Meiosis
- Holger Stark – Structural Dynamics
- Alec M. Wodtke – Dynamics at Surfaces

=== Research groups ===
The Max Planck Institute for Biophysical Chemistry is particularly engaged in the support of junior scientists. 20 independent research groups pursue their own research goals.

- Loren B. Andreas – Solid-State NMR Spectroscopy
- Gopalakrishnan Balasubramanian – Nanoscale Spin Imaging
- Marina Bennati – Electron-Spin Resonance Spectroscopy
- Bert L. de Groot – Computational Biomolecular Dynamics
- Alex Faesen – Biochemistry of Signal Dynamics
- Jens Frahm – Biomedical NMR
- Stefan Glöggler – NMR Signal Enhancement
- Aljaz Godec – Mathematical Biophysics
- Stefan Jakobs – Structure and Dynamics of Mitochondria
- Peter Lenart – Cytoskeletal Dynamics in Oocytes
- Juliane Liepe – Quantitative and Systems Biology
- Grazvydas Lukinavicinus – Chromatin Labeling and Imaging
- Samuel Meek – Precision Infrared Spectroscopy on Small Molecules
- Vladimir Pena – Macromolecular Crystallography
- Reinhard Schuh – Molecular Organogenesis
- Johannes Söding – Quantitative and Computational Biology
- Alexander Stein – Membrane Protein Biochemistry
- Henning Urlaub – Bioanalytical Mass Spectrometry
- Wolfgang Wintermeyer – Ribosome Dynamics
- Markus Zweckstetter – Structure Determination of Proteins Using NMR

=== Emeritus groups ===
After retiring, directors of the institute can actively continue their research for a couple of years.

- Gregor Eichele – Genes and Behavior
- Herbert Jäckle – Molecular Developmental Biology
- Reinhard Jahn – Laboratory of Neurobiology
- Thomas Jovin – Laboratory of Cellular Dynamics
- Reinhard Lührmann – Cellular Biochemistry
- Erwin Neher – Membrane Biophysics
- Jürgen Troe – Spectroscopy and Photochemical Kinetics

=== Former departments ===
The institute has undergone a permanent change in research with the closing of departments after their heads have retired and by continuously establishing new departments. Some of the former directors pursue their research even after their emeritus Group has expired and can still be contacted at the institute (*).

- Otto D. Creutzfeldt – Neurobiology (1971–1992)
- Manfred Eigen – Biochemical Kinetics (1971–1995)
- Dieter Gallwitz – Molecular Genetics (1985–2004)
- Manfred Kahlweit – Kinetics of Phase Transformations (1971–1996)
- Hans Kuhn – Molecular Systems (1971–1984)
- Leo de Maeyer – Experimental Methods (1971–1996)
- Bert Sakmann – Cell Physiology (1985–1988)
- Fritz-Peter Schäfer – Laser Physics (1971–1994)
- Hans Strehlow – Electrochemistry and Reaction Kinetics (1971–1984)
- Klaus Weber – Biochemistry and Cell Biology (1973–2004)
- Albert Weller – Spectroscopy (1971–1990)
- Victor P. Whittaker – Neurochemistry (1973–1987)

=== Biomedizinische NMR Forschungs GmbH ===
The institute also accommodates the independent Biomedizinische NMR Forschungs GmbH headed by Jens Frahm, which was founded in 1993. The focus of this association is the development and application of spatially resolved NMR techniques for non-invasive studies of the central nervous system in animals and humans. These innovative approaches allow for unique insights into the structure, metabolism and function of the intact living brain. Jens Frahm and his coworkers invented a rapid acquisition technique for magnetic resonance imaging termed FLASH MRI (fast low angle shot) technique which allowed for a 100-fold reduction of the measuring times of cross-sectional and three-dimensional images. The FLASH technique led the ground for many modern MRI applications in diagnostic imaging.

== International Max Planck Research Schools ==
In 2000, two International Max Planck Research Schools (IMPRS) were established together with the Georg August University Göttingen, the German Primate Center and the Max Planck Institute for Experimental Medicine: the IMPRS for Molecular Biology and the IMPRS for Neurosciences (in cooperation with the Max Planck Institute for Dynamics and Self-Organization and the European Neuroscience Institute Göttingen). A third graduate school, the IMPRS for Physics of Biological and Complex Systems, was opened in 2008 (in cooperation with the Max Planck Institute for Dynamics and Self-Organization).
