= Alberto Diaspro =

Physicist

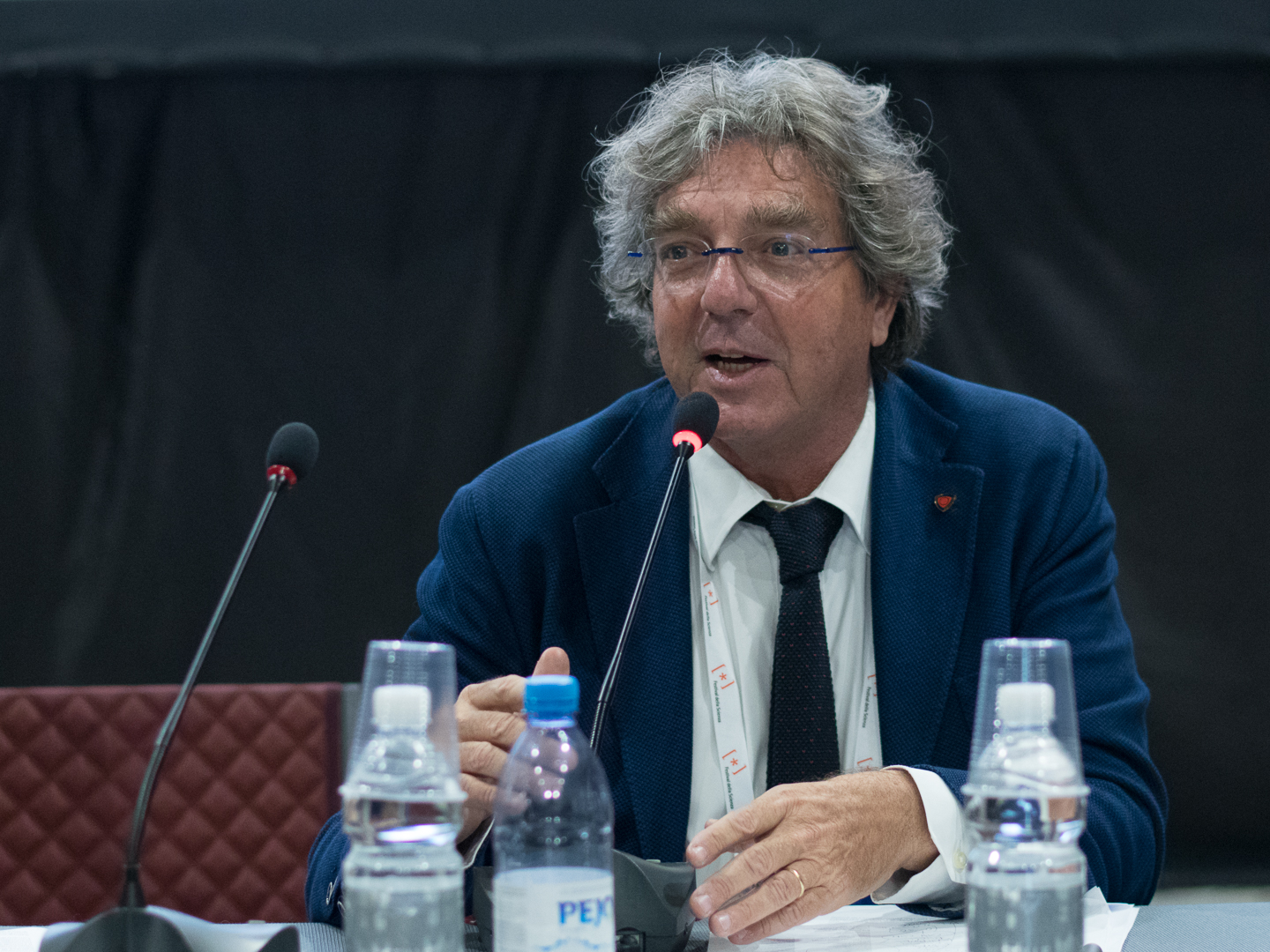
- Alberto Diaspro, 2017
- Born: 7 April 1959 (age 67)
- Education: University of Genoa
- Occupation: Physicist
- Known for: Microscopy
- Scientific career
- Workplaces: Istituto italiano di tecnologia University of Genoa
- Website: www.iit.it/people-details/-/people/alberto-diaspro

Alberto Diaspro (born 7 April 1959 in Genoa, Italy) is an Italian scientist. He received his doctoral degree in electronic engineering from the university of Genoa, Italy, in 1983. He is full professor in applied physics at university of Genoa. He is research director of Nanoscopy Italian Institute of Technology. Alberto Diaspro is President of the Italian biophysical society SIBPA. In 2022 he received the Gregorio Weber Award for excellence in fluorescence.
