= Max Planck Institute for Multidisciplinary Sciences =

Research institute in Göttingen, Germany

- Max-Planck-Institut für Multidisziplinäre Naturwissenschaften
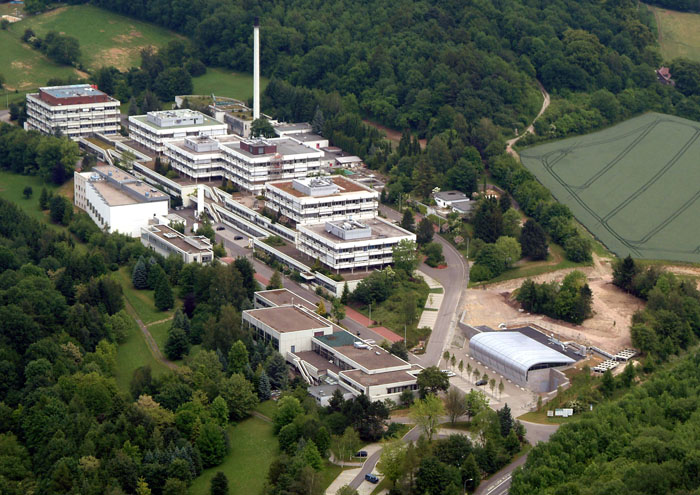
- Aerial photograph of one of the two locations of the institute–the former MPI for Biophysical Chemistry
- Predecessor: MPI for Biophysical Chemistry; MPI for Experimental Medicine
- Formation: January 1, 2022; 4 years ago
- Type: Scientific institute
- Purpose: Basic research in physics, chemistry, and biology; research in structural biology, cell biology, neuroscience, and biomedicine
- Headquarters: Göttingen, Lower Saxony, Germany
- Parent organization: Max Planck Society

Max Planck Institute for Multidisciplinary Sciences (German: Max-Planck-Institut für Multidisziplinäre Naturwissenschaften) is a research institute of the Max Planck Society, located in Göttingen, Germany. It was formed on January 1, 2022, through a merger of Max Planck Institute for Biophysical Chemistry and Max Planck Institute for Experimental Medicine.

== See also ==
- List of Max Planck Institutes
