= Catherine G Galbraith =

American biophysicist

- Education: University of Pennsylvania; University of California, San Diego
- Known for: Cell migration Super-Resolution Microscopy
- Scientific career
- Fields: Biophysics; Super-Resolution Microscopy
- Workplaces: Duke University; National Institutes of Health; Janelia Research Campus; Oregon Health & Science University
- Academic advisors: Shu Chien; Richard Skalak; Michael Sheetz
- Website: Galbraith Lab

Catherine G Galbraith is an American scientist who is an associate professor of Biomedical Engineering at OHSU and Discovery Engine Investigator at Knight Cancer Institute, known for her work in cell mobility and cell migration as well as super-resolution microscopy. Together with James Galbraith, she heads the Galbraith Lab.

== Education ==
Galbraith studied Bioengineering at the University of Pennsylvania in Philadelphia, PA, USA. After receiving her BSc in 1985, she attended a Master's program in Bioengineering, which she finished in 1987. Subsequently, Galbraith earned her Ph.D. in Bioengineering in 1995 at University of California, San Diego, CA, USA, advised by Prof Dr Shu Chien.

== Career and research ==
For her postgraduate work between 1995 and 2000, Galbraith worked as a postdoctoral researcher with Prof Dr Michael Sheetz at Duke University in Durham, NC, USA, focusing primarily on cell mobility and migration.

Between 2000 and 2013, Galbraith worked at the National Institutes of Health, Bethesda, MD, continuing her work on cell mobility and migration. First as a Research Fellow (2000-2005) and an Independent Senior Researcher (2005-2010) at the National Institute of Dental and Craniofacial Research (NIDCR) and finally as a scientist (2010-2013) at the Eunice Kennedy Shriver National Institute of Child Health and Human Development (NICHD).

Between 2010 and 2012, Galbraith was also, for the first time, a visiting scientist at Howard Hughes Medical Institute's Janelia Research Campus.

Collaborations with scientists at Janelia, in particular Eric Betzig and Harald Hess, resulted, amongst others, in key papers that helped to establish the localization-based super-resolution microscopy technique Photoactivated localization microscopy (PALM). Betzig received the Nobel Prize for PALM in 2014.

Since 2013, Galbraith has been an Associate Professor of Biomedical Engineering at OHSU and Discovery Engine Investigator at Knight Cancer Institute.

Together with her husband, James Galbraith, Galbraith uses multidisciplinary approaches and advanced microscopy techniques to explore the mechanisms behind cellular decision-making in a variety of processes, including motility, synaptogenesis, and metastasis.

Since 2019, Galbraith has also again been a visiting scientist at Howard Hughes Medical Institute's Janelia Research Campus.

== Awards and honours ==
- 1997: Biomedical Engineering Society -- Young Investigator of the Year
- 2014: ASCB/ NIGMS Life Magnified Dulles Airport Exhibit
- 2014: Cover of Nature Publishing Special Issue for Super-Resolution Nobel Prize
- 2021: H1 Connects (formerly Faculty Opinions) - Faculty Member of the Year, Biological Physics
- 2022: W. M. Keck Foundation Award
