= Michael W. Davidson =

- Born: November 14, 1950; Fort Lewis, Washington
- Died: December 24, 2015 (aged 65)
- Education: Georgia State University

Michael Wesley Davidson (November 14, 1950 – December 24, 2015) was an American research scientist and microscopist. He used microscopes to create images of crystallized substances like DNA and hormones, and he contributed to Nobel Prize-honored research about the inner workings of cells. He is credited by 2014 Nobel Laureate Eric Betzig with teaching Betzig and fellow researcher Harald Hess about fluorescent proteins and providing the samples that led to the development of photoactivated localization microscopy (PALM), a super-resolution microscopy technique.

He ran the optical microscopy laboratory at Florida State University's National High Magnetic Field Laboratory as a researcher.

He was from Atlanta and a graduate of Georgia State University.
