= Jennifer Lippincott-Schwartz =

American biologist

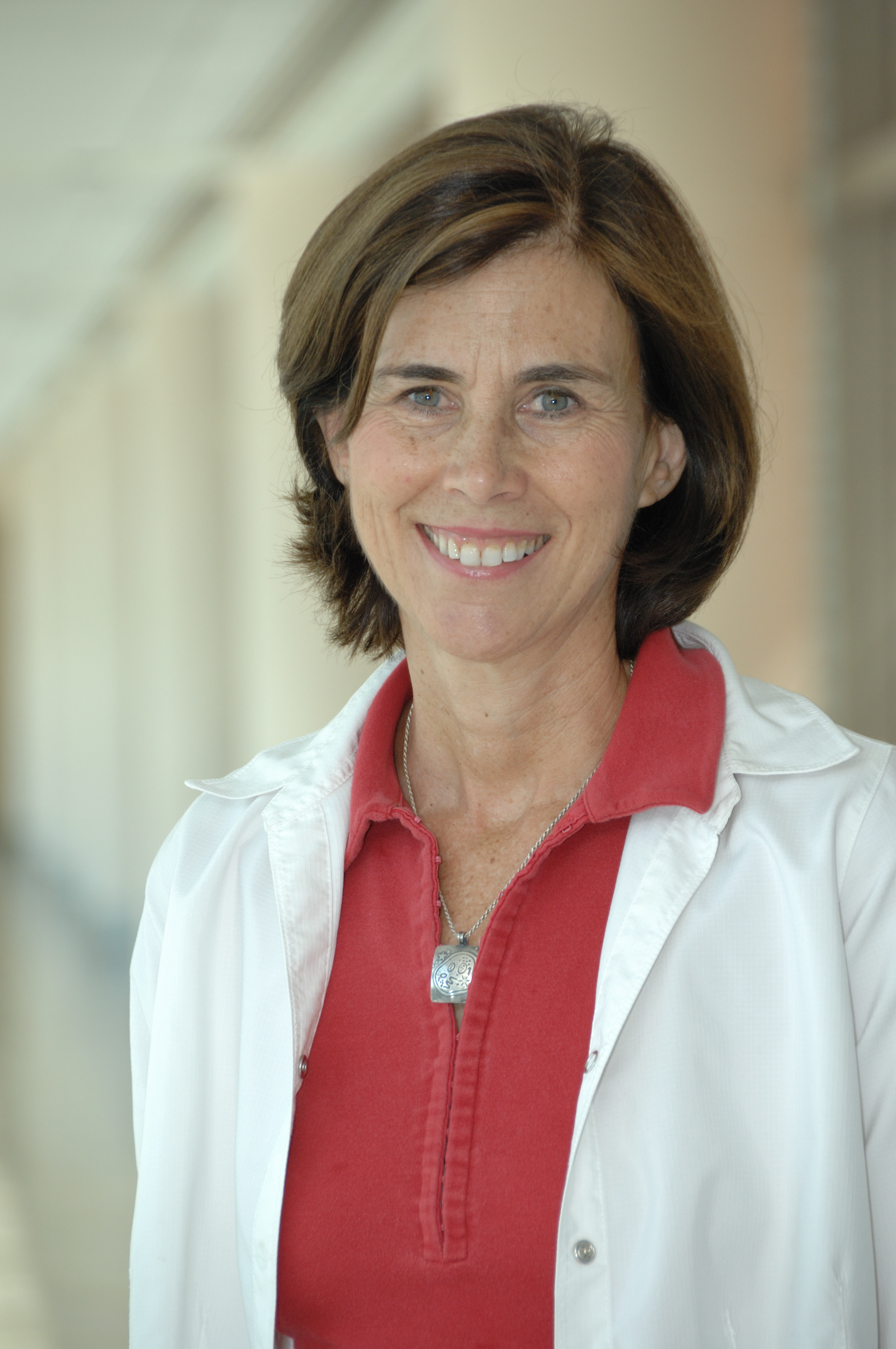
- Born: Jennifer Lippincott; October 19, 1952 (age 74); Manhattan, Kansas
- Education: Swarthmore College; Johns Hopkins University
- Spouse: Jonathan Schwartz
- Scientific career
- Fields: Organelle Biology
- Workplaces: Eunice Kennedy Shriver National Institute of Child Health and Human Development

Jennifer Lippincott-Schwartz is a Senior Group Leader at Howard Hughes Medical Institute's Janelia Research Campus and a founding member of the Neuronal Cell Biology Program at Janelia. Previously, she was the Chief of the Section on Organelle Biology in the Cell Biology and Metabolism Program, in the Division of Intramural Research in the Eunice Kennedy Shriver National Institute of Child Health and Human Development at the National Institutes of Health from 1993 to 2016. Lippincott-Schwartz received her PhD from Johns Hopkins University, and performed post-doctoral training with Richard Klausner at the NICHD, NIH in Bethesda, Maryland.

Lippincott-Schwartz's research revealed that the organelles of eukaryotic cells are dynamic, self-organized structures that constantly regenerate themselves through intracellular vesicle traffic, rather than static structures. She is also a pioneer in developing live cell imaging techniques to study the dynamic interactions of molecules in cells, including photobleaching and photoactivation techniques which allow investigation of subcellular localization, mobility, transport routes, and turnover of important cellular proteins related to membrane trafficking and compartmentalization. Lippincott-Schwartz's lab also tests mechanistic hypotheses related to protein and organelle functions and dynamics by utilizing quantitative measurements through kinetic modeling and simulation experiments. Along with Craig Blackstone, Lippincott-Schwartz utilized advanced imaging techniques to reveal a more accurate picture of how the peripheral endoplasmic reticulum is structured. Their findings may yield new insights for genetic diseases affecting proteins that help shape the endoplasmic reticulum. Additionally, Lippincott-Schwartz's laboratory demonstrated that Golgi enzymes constitutively recycle back to the endoplasmic reticulum and that such recycling plays a central role in the maintenance, biogenesis, and inheritance of the Golgi apparatus in mammalian cells.

Within Lippincott-Schwartz lab, current projects include several cell biological areas. For example, protein transport and cytoskeleton interaction, organelle assembly and disassembly, and cell polarity generation. There are also projects analyzing the dynamics of proteins that have been fluorescently labeled. These proteins are labeled using several live cell imaging techniques such as FRAP, FCS, and photoactivation.

Lippincott-Schwartz has dedicated her most recent lab research to photoactivation localization microscopy (PALM), which allows the viewing of molecular distributions of high densities at the nano-scale.

== Early life ==
Jennifer Lippincott-Schwartz was born on October 19, 1952, in Manhattan, Kansas. Her father was a professor of physical chemistry at the University of Maryland and a periodic table could be found hanging in her family's household kitchen. Lippincott-Schwartz's exposure to her father's work is what sparked her love of science. The family moved to a farm in Northern Virginia that had several horses and various other animals. This is where Lippincott-Schwartz found her love of biology.

== Education ==
Lippincott-Schwartz attended Swarthmore College, where she majored in psychology and philosophy and graduated with honors from Swarthmore College in 1974. She taught science at a girl's high school in Kenya for two years before returning to the USA and entering a Master's program in Biology at Stanford University where she worked on DNA repair in the laboratory of Philip Hanawalt. She then entered a Biochemistry Ph.D. program at Johns Hopkins University, where she worked in Douglas Fambrough's lab in the Carnegie Institution of Embryology and studied the dynamics of lysosomal membrane proteins.

== Career ==
=== Postdoctoral work ===
After graduating from Johns Hopkins in 1986, Lippincott-Schwartz joined Richard D. Klausner's lab at the National Institutes of Health. Using the drug brefeldin A to perturb membrane trafficking, she showed that membranes cycle between the endoplasmic reticulum and the Golgi, leading to a recognition that cellular organelles are dynamic, self-organized structures that constantly regenerate themselves through intracellular vesicle traffic.

=== NIH ===
Lippincott-Schwartz became a staff fellow at the National Institute of Child Health and Human Development at NIH in 1990. During this time, Lippincott-Schwartz began developing techniques to use green fluorescent protein (GFP) to visualize cellular trafficking pathways in living cells. She refined the technique of fluorescence recovery after photobleaching (FRAP) to use in studying the dynamics of membrane proteins. In this method, GFP-tagged membrane proteins are subjected to photobleaching in a small area of the cell, and then the cell is imaged to discover how long it takes for non-bleached proteins to replace the bleached ones, i.e. how long it takes for the fluorescence to recover. Before this work, it was thought that the membrane proteins in organelles such as the ER, Golgi, and plasma membrane were fixed in place. However, the FRAP technique proved that molecules within cells move quite rapidly and are able to diffuse freely. Lippincott-Schwartz subsequently introduced photoactivatable GFP that increases its fluorescence after irradiation. This allowed Lippincott-Schwartz and her post-doc George Patterson to track the transport of cargo molecules through the Golgi with great precision, leading to the realization that cargo transport is not an ordered sequential process; instead, the apparently separate membranous stacks of the Golgi are a single continuous structure, and proteins rapidly equilibrate through the layers.

Lippincott-Schwartz's work on photoactivatable GFP led to a collaboration with Eric Betzig of Howard Hughes Medical Institute's Janelia Farm Research Campus in which the ability to turn GFP fluorescence on and off was used to develop one of the first "superresolution imaging" technologies, photoactivation localization microscopy (PALM). The development of "super-resolved fluorescence microscopy" was recognized in 2014 by the award of the Nobel Prize in Chemistry to Eric Betzig along with William E. Moerner of Stanford University, and Stefan W. Hell of Max Planck Institute for Biophysical Chemistry.

Lippincott-Schwartz has used PALM to assess the stoichiometry and composition of membrane receptors and has collaborated with Vladislav Verkhusha of Albert Einstein College of Medicine in New York to develop two-color PALM. She used a combination of five super-resolution techniques to show that the endoplasmic reticulum is composed of a dense tubular matrix, instead of the sheets seen at lower resolution.

=== Janelia Research Campus ===
In 2016, Lippincott-Schwartz moved from NIH to the Janelia Research Campus of the Howard Hughes Medical Institute to initiate the Neuronal Cell Biology Program at Janelia.

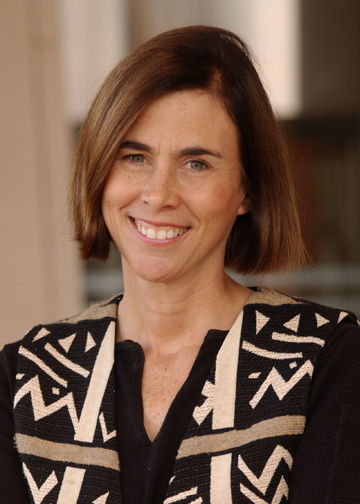
Lippincott-Schwartz in 2017

== Professional awards ==
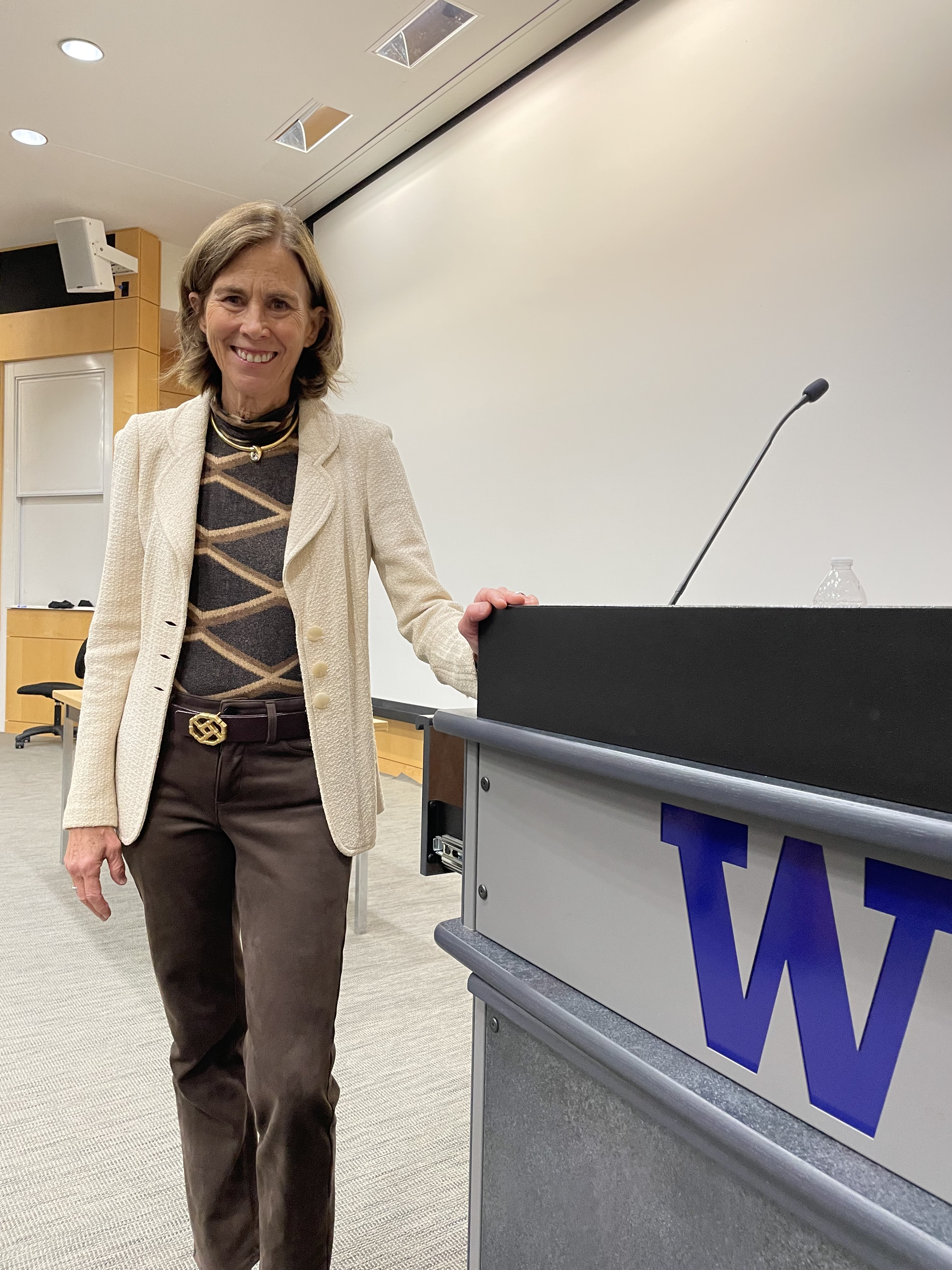
Lippincott-Schwartz at the University of Washington in Seattle in 2025

- E.B. Wilson Medal of the American Society for Cell Biology (2020)
- American Academy of Arts and Sciences Fellow (2019).
- President of the American Society of Cell Biology (2014)
- Honorary Fellow of the Royal Microscopical Society, UK (2014)
- Honorary Friedrich-Merz Professorship at Goethe-University, Frankfurt, Germany (2013)
- Keith Porter Award, American Society of Cell Biology (2011)
- Non-Resident Fellow, Salk Institute (2010 to present)
- Elected Fellow, Biophysical Society (2010)
- Pearse Prize, Royal Microscopy Society (2010)
- Elected to the Institute of Medicine of the National Academies, 2009
- Elected to the National Academy of Sciences, Biochemistry Section, 2008
- Elected AAAS Fellow, 2008, for "outstanding contributions to the field of fluorescent protein imaging, including the creation of photoactivable GFP and its use in new super-resolution imaging techniques"
- Elected Distinguished NIH Investigator, 2008
- National Institutes of Health Award of Merit, "For fundamental contributions to the understanding of how intracellular organelles are assembled and how proteins move within cells" (2003)
- The Feulgen Prize, Society of Histochemistry (2001)
- Keith Porter Fellow, awarded by K. R. Porter Foundation for Excellence in Cell Biology (1998)
- The Wellcome Visiting Professorship in the Basic Medical Sciences (1998)
- NIH Predoctoral Fellowship Award (1979–1981)
- Carnegie Institute of Washington Fellowship (1981–1985)
- Pharmacology Research Associate of the National Institute of General Medical Sciences (1986–1988)
- National Research Service Award (1988–1990)
