= Luke D. Lavis =

HHMI scientist

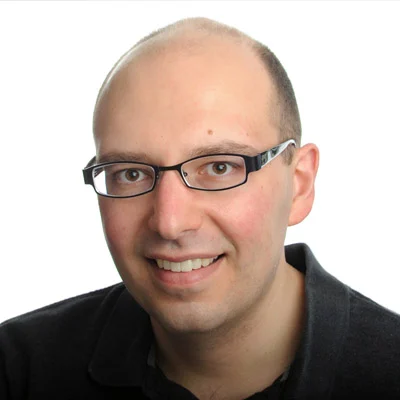

Luke D. Lavis is an American chemist working at the Janelia Research Campus of the Howard Hughes Medical Institute. He is best known for his work on small-molecule dyes that enable biological research.

== Early life and education ==
Lavis was born in 1977, grew up in the state of Oregon, and studied chemistry at Oregon State University. After his undergraduate schooling, he joined the company Molecular Probes, where he made small-molecule dyes for use in biology. After working there for four years, he returned to school, obtaining his Ph.D. in organic chemistry at the University of Wisconsin-Madison in the lab of Ronald T. Raines. After graduating, he moved in 2008 to the Janelia Research Campus of the Howard Hughes Medical Institute to start his own lab.

== Research and career ==
Lavis's lab uses modern chemical syntheses to develop small molecule dyes for biological research. In particular these new dyes offer increased brightness, new spectral regions, and biocompatible features such as cell permeability. In addition to improved performance for conventional uses, these dyes have enabled microscopy advances such PALM and other techniques for super-resolution microscopy.

Many potential users of these newly developed dyes do not have the facilities, or the expertise, to synthesize them themselves, even when the structure known. To help these scientists, Lavis and his lab act as a "dye Santa", who disseminate these dyes for free to colleagues and other labs.

== Awards and honors ==
- In 2025, Lavis won the Gregorio Weber Award.
- In 2015, Lavis was named as one of the Talented 12 by Chemical & Engineering News.

== Selected publications ==
- Lavis, Luke D; Raines, Ronald T (2008). "Bright ideas for chemical biology". ACS Chemical Biology. 3 (3). ACS Publications: 142–155. doi:10.1021/cb700248m. PMC 2802578. PMID 18355003.
- Grimm, Jonathan B; English, Brian P; Chen, Jiji; Slaughter, Joel P; Zhang, Zhengjian; Revyakin, Andrey; Patel, Ronak; Macklin, John J; Normanno, Davide; Singer, Robert H; Lionnet, Timothée; Lavis, Luke D (2015). "A general method to improve fluorophores for live-cell and single-molecule microscopy". Nature Methods. 12 (3). Nature Publishing Group US New York: 244–250. doi:10.1038/nmeth.3256. PMC 4344395. PMID 25599551.
- Liu, Zhe; Lavis, Luke D; Betzig, Eric (2015). "Imaging live-cell dynamics and structure at the single-molecule level". Molecular Cell. 58 (4). Elsevier: 644–659. doi:10.1016/j.molcel.2015.02.033. PMID 26000849.
- Grimm, Jonathan B.; Tkachuk, Ariana N.; Xie, Liangqi; Choi, Heejun; Mohar, Boaz; Falco, Natalie; Schaefer, Kathy; Patel, Ronak; Zheng, Qinsi; Liu, Zhe; Lippincott-Schwartz, Jennifer; Brown, Timothy A.; Lavis, Luke D. (2020). "A general method to optimize and functionalize red-shifted rhodamine dyes". Nature Methods. 17 (8). Nature Publishing Group US New York: 815–821. doi:10.1038/s41592-020-0909-6. PMC 7396317. PMID 32719532.
