= Lattice light-sheet microscopy =

Kind of microscopy

Lattice light-sheet microscopy is a modified version of light sheet fluorescence microscopy that increases image acquisition speed while decreasing damage to cells caused by phototoxicity. This is achieved by using a structured light sheet to excite fluorescence in successive planes of a specimen, generating a time series of 3D images which can provide information about dynamic biological processes.

It was developed in the early 2010s by a team led by Eric Betzig. According to an interview conducted by The Washington Post, Betzig believes that this development will have a greater impact than the work that earned him the 2014 Nobel Prize in Chemistry for "the development of super-resolution fluorescence microscopy".

== Setup of Lattice Light-sheet Fluorescence Microscopy ==
(partial) Optical path of a lattice light sheet microscope. (a). from the laser lines and the AOTF, (b). x cylindrical lens, (c). z cylindrical lens, (d). SLM, (e). annulus mask, (f). z and x galvos., (g). excitation objective, (h). observation objective, (i). to EMCCD camera. inset: zoom on the objectives.

Lattice light sheet microscopy is a novel combination of techniques from Light sheet fluorescence microscopy, Bessel beam microscopy, and Super-resolution microscopy (specifically structured illumination microscopy, SIM).

In lattice light sheet microscopy, very similarly to light sheet microscopy, the illumination of the sample occurs perpendicular to the image detection. Initially the light sheet is formed by stretching the linearly polarized circular input beam with a pair of cylindrical lenses along the x axis and then compressing it with an additional pair of lenses along the z axis. This modification creates a thin sheet of light that is then projected onto a binary ferroelectric spatial light modulator (SLM). The SLM is a device that spatially varies the waveform of a beam of light. The light that is reflected back from the SLM is used to eliminate unwanted diffraction. Diffraction is eliminated by the transform lens that creates a Fraunhofer diffraction pattern from the reflected light at an opaque mask containing a transparent annulus. Optical lattices are two or three dimensional interference patterns, which here are produced by the transparent annular ring. The mask is conjugate to x and z galvanometers. This quality of the microscope is important for the dithered mode of operation, where the light sheet must be oscillated within the x axis.

The lattice light-sheet microscope has two modes of operation: In the dithered mode, the light sheet is rapidly scanned along the x axis and only one image is recorded per Z plane, at normal diffraction limited resolutions. The second mode of operation is the structured illumination microscopy mode (SIM). SIM is a technique where a grid pattern of excitation light is superimposed on the sample and rotated in steps between the capture of each image. These images are then processed via an algorithm to produce a reconstructed image past the limit of diffraction that is built into our optical instruments.

== Theory ==
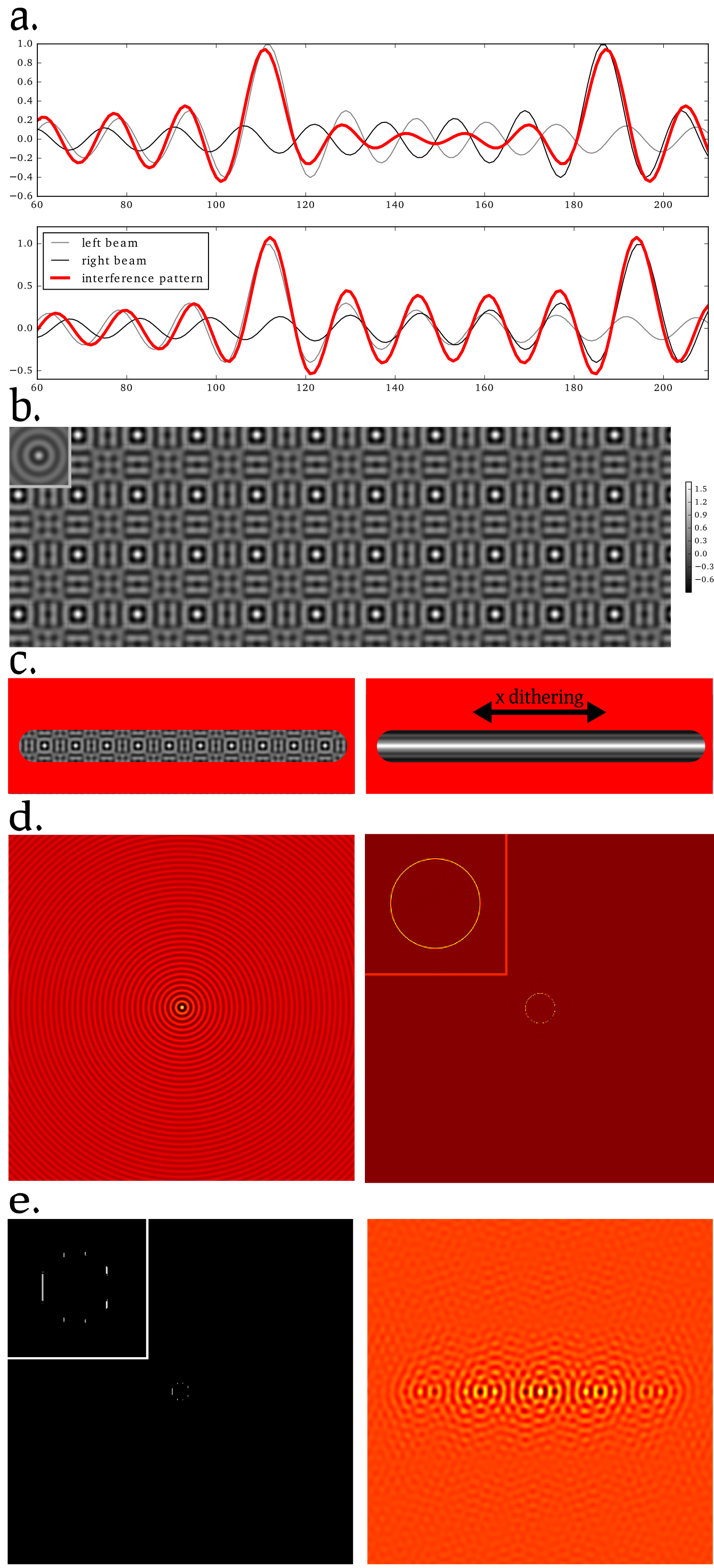
Lattice of destructively interfering Bessel beams. (a). schematic of destructive (top) and constructive (bottom) interference patterns between two Bessel beams. Note how the rings between the two centers get attenuated/amplified. (b). interference pattern on a 2D optical lattice created by the interference of Bessel beams. inset: one Bessel function before interference, (c)-left: SLM-mediated selection of a subpattern of the lattice, red: SLM pixels off, -right: view of the incident beam at sample (after dithering the beam in the x direction), (d). Bessel function (left) and its intensity in the Fourier domain (right), and a zoom on the annulus (inset), (e). intensity at the Fourier plane of an array of Bessel beams (left) and its intensity at the object plane (right).

Lattice light sheet microscopy can be viewed as an improvement of Bessel beam light sheet microscopes in terms of axial resolution (also termed resolution in z). In Bessel beam light sheet microscopes, a non-diffracting Bessel beam is first created then dithered in the x direction to produce a sheet. However, the lobes of a Bessel functions carry as much energy as the central spot, resulting in illumination out of the depth of field of the observation objective.

Lattice light sheet microscopy aims at reducing the intensity of the outer lobes of the Bessel functions by destructive interference. To do so, a two-dimensional lattice of regularly spaced Bessel beams is created. Then, destructive interference can be triggered by carefully tuning the spacing between the beams (that is, the period of the lattice).

Practically, the lattice of interfering Bessel beams is engineered by a spatial light modulator (SLM), a liquid-crystal device whose individual pixels can be switched on and off to display a binary pattern. Due to the matrix nature of the SLM, the generated pattern contains many unwanted frequencies. Thus, these are filtered out by the means of an annulus placed in a plane conjugated with the back focal plane of the objective (Fourier domain).

Finally, to obtain a uniform intensity at the sample rather than a lattice, the sheet is dithered using a galvanometer oscillating in the x direction.

== Improvements On Other Methods ==
Lattice Light-Sheet Microscopy combines high resolution and clarity at high image acquisition speed, without damaging samples through photobleaching. Photobleaching is a major and highly common problem in fluorescence microscopy wherein fluorescent tags will lose their ability to emit photons upon repeated excitation. Unlike common fluorescence microscopes, samples in a Lattice Light-Sheet Microscope experience photobleaching at a rate drastically reduced when compared to conventional techniques (In conventional techniques, this results in an image signal that gets weaker over the course of multiple excitations). This allows for longer exposures without loss of signal, which in turn allows for video to be captured at over longer periods of time. The Lattice method also has the ability to resolve 200 to 1000 planes per second, an extremely fast imaging rate that allows continuous video capture. This capture rate is one order of magnitude faster than Bessel beam excitation, and two orders of magnitude faster than Spinning Disk Confocal Microscopy. These two advantages combine to allow researchers to take very detailed movies over long periods of time.

== Limitations ==
Lattice light sheet microscopy is limited to transparent and thin samples to achieve good image quality. The quality of image acquired degrades with imaging depth. This phenomenon occurs due to sample-induced aberrations, and it has been proposed that imaging samples to beyond 20 to 100 μm will require adaptive optics.

=== Resolution ===
- SIM: 150 nm by 230 nm xy resolution, 280 nm z resolution
- Dithered: 230 nm by 230 nm xy resolution, ~370 nm z resolution

=== Contrast ===
- Because the excitation band is ~1.0 micron in width, and the focal depth of the detection objective is ~1.1 microns deep, the majority of illuminated molecules are in the focal plane.

=== Depth into sample ===
- Imaging beyond 20–100 microns in depth is theorized to be possible through combining lattice light-sheet technology with adaptive optics.

== Applications ==
Lattice light sheet microscopy is useful for in-vivo cellular localization and super resolution. Lattice light sheets' confined excitation band keeps nearly all illuminated cells in focus. The reduction of large, out of focus spots allow precise tracking of individual cells at a high molecular density, a capability unattainable through previous microscopy methods. Consequently, lattice light sheet is being used for a number of dynamic cellular interactions. The decrease in phototoxicity has created opportunities to study the subcellular processes of embryos without damaging their living tissues. Studies have examined and quantified the extent of the highly variable growth patterns of microtubules throughout mitosis. Dictyostelium discoideum (slime mold) cells were imaged during their rapid chemotactic movement toward one another and the initial contact.

The aggregation of T cell and target cells was observed, along with the subsequent formation of the immunological synapse. The advancements of the lattice sheet method revealed three-dimensional movement patterns of actin as well as lamellipodial protrusion in these interactions. The increase in imaging speed also allowed the observation of fast moving neutrophils through the extracellular matrix in another study.

The technique, along with chemical and genetic manipulation techniques, was used to capture a live image of a virus (a virus that was engineered to spike COVID-19 proteins) infecting a cell, by injecting its genetic material into the cell's endosome for the first time, at Harvard Medical School, in cooperation with other institutions.

== Future work ==
The technique is being actively developed at the Janelia Research Campus of the Howard Hughes Medical Institute. Eric Betzig has stated that his goal is to combine his work on microscopy to develop a "high-speed, high-resolution, low-impact tool that can look deep inside biological systems." Penetration deeper than 20–100 μm may be achieved by combining lattice light-sheet microscopy with adaptive optics.
