= Na Ji =

American biophysicist

- Born: China
- Education: University of California Berkeley; University of Science & Technology of China
- Known for: Adaptive optics
- Spouse: Eric Betzig
- Children: Max Betzig; Mia Betzig; Zoe Betzig
- Scientific career
- Workplaces: UC Berkeley; Janelia Research Campus
- Website: www.jilab.net

Na Ji is an American biophysicist and the Luis Alvarez Memorial Chair in Experimental Physics at UC Berkeley, where her work focuses on optical microscopy techniques for in vivo imaging and biophotonics. She has a joint appointment as faculty scientist at Lawrence Berkeley National Laboratory.

== Early life and education ==
Na Ji earned her Bachelor of Science in chemical physics at the University of Science & Technology of China in Hefei, China in 2000 before pursuing a Ph.D. in chemistry at the University of California, Berkeley in 2005. She then joined the Janelia Research Campus of Howard Hughes Medical Institute as a postdoctoral fellow, before starting her own group there in 2011, focused on developing new optical microscopy techniques for brain research.

== Research and career ==
Na Ji's research at Janelia Research Campus was dedicated to understanding the input-output relationships in neural circuits in the cerebral cortex, using novel microscopy techniques mixing structured light and adaptive optics. In 2017 she joined UC Berkeley as an associate professor in the Department of Physics and Molecular and Cellular Biology. As of January 2024, she is currently a Professor of Neurobiology, as well as the Luis Alvarez Memorial Chair in Experimental Physics at UC Berkeley. Her research has allowed researchers in her field to understand the brain more in depth than ever before.

== Personal life ==
Na Ji is married to Nobel prize laureate, Eric Betzig. With Betzig, she has three children, Max, Mia and Zoe.
