= Harald Hess =

Physicist

- Born: September 12, 1955 (age 71); Cape Girardeau, Missouri
- Education: University of Chicago (BSc), Princeton University (PhD)
- Known for: Photoactivated localization microscopy
- Awards: Member of the National Academy of Sciences (2018)
- Scientific career
- Fields: scanning probe microscopy; light microscopy; electron microscopy
- Workplaces: Howard Hughes Medical Institute Janelia Research Campus; KLA-Tencor; Bell Labs; Massachusetts Institute of Technology
- Website: Hess Lab

Harald Frederick Hess (born September 12, 1955) is an American physicist and Senior Group Leader at Howard Hughes Medical Institute's Janelia Research Campus, known for his work in scanning probe microscopy, light microscopy and electron microscopy.

== Education ==
Hess earned his BS degree in Physics from the University of Chicago in 1977 before pursuing further studies at Princeton University, where he obtained his PhD in Physics in 1982.

== Career and research ==
As a postdoctoral researcher at MIT from 1982 until 1986, Hess focused his research on trapping hydrogen atoms and achieving Bose-Einstein condensation (BEC). During this time, he developed the concept of evaporative cooling as a means to achieve BEC, which was a significant contribution to the field and ultimately led to the awarding of the 2001 Nobel Prize in Physics.

Afterward, Hess joined Bell Labs as technical staff member. During his time there, he designed and developed a range of low-temperature scanning probe microscopes to visualize various physics phenomena, including vortices in superconductors.

After 1997, he spent eight years in industry at KLA-Tencor, where he focused on developing advanced equipment for the production and inspection of hard disk drives and semiconductors.

In 2005, he and his colleague Eric Betzig discovered photoactivatable fluorescent proteins and invented PALM (photoactivated localization microscopy), which enabled the visualization of cell structures beyond the diffraction limit. The PALM was constructed in a La Jolla condominium, underwent testing at the National Institute of Health, and contributed to the awarding of the 2014 Nobel Prize in Chemistry.

At the Janelia Research Campus of the Howard Hughes Medical Institute, Hess further developed PALM into a 3D super-resolution microscopy technique and is currently exploring its potential applications for cell biology research. Additionally, Hess is actively working on developing 3D electron microscopy techniques for volumetric imaging of cells and neural tissue.

Overall, Hess's research centers on developing new forms of microscopy and refining existing technologies to uncover new physical or biological characteristics.

== Awards and honours ==
- 1997 American Physical Society Fellow
- 2016 Fellow of the American Association for the Advancement of Science
- 2018 Member of the National Academy of Sciences
- 2023 James Prize in Science and Technology Integration by the National Science Foundation
- 2024 National Inventors Hall of Fame
