= Janelia Research Campus =

Research institute in Virginia, USA

Coordinates: 39.0716°N 77.4648°W

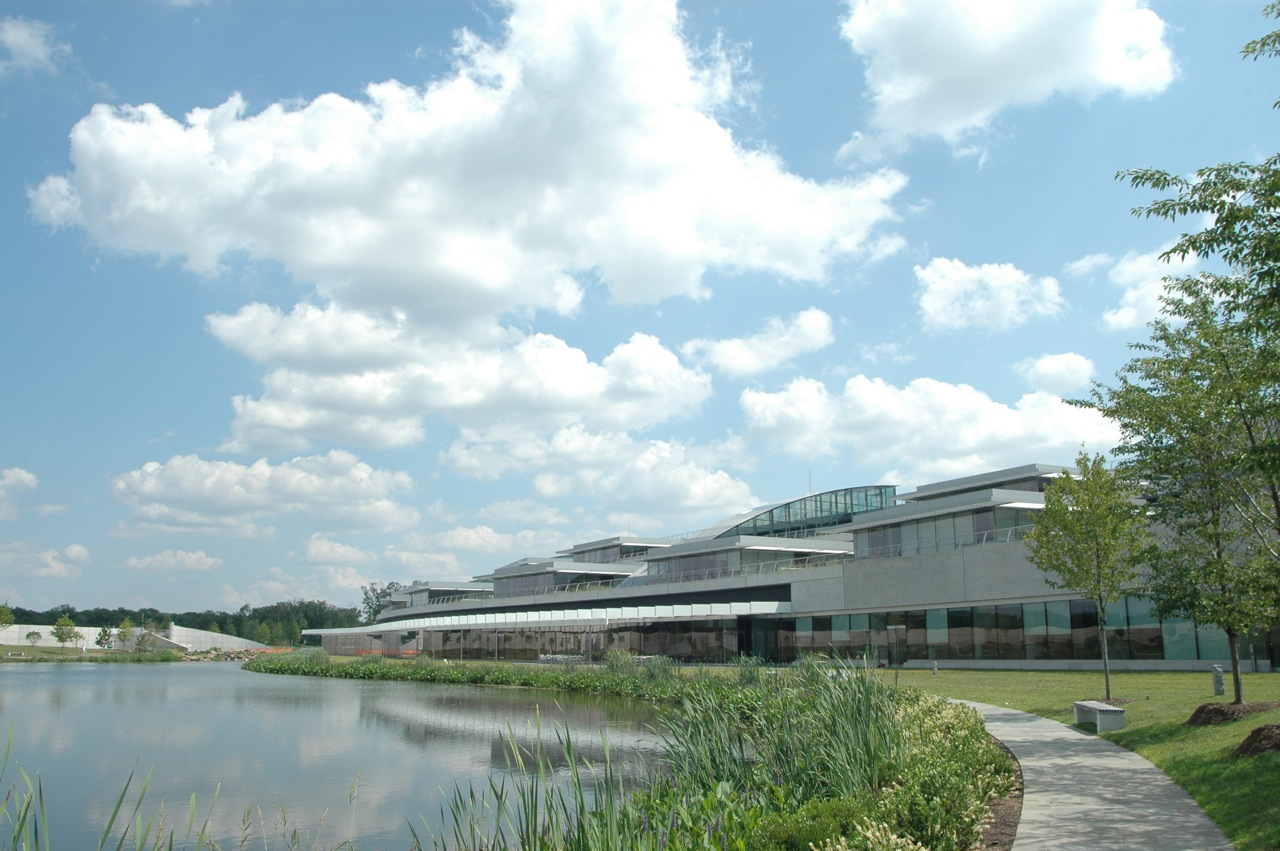
- Established: September 6, 2006
- Research type: neurobiology
- Budget: $300 million
- Director: Nelson Spruston
- Staff: 650
- Location: Ashburn, Virginia
- Campus: 689 acres (2.79 km^{2})
- Operating agency: Howard Hughes Medical Institute
- Nobel laureates: Eric Betzig
- Website: www.janelia.org

Janelia Research Campus is a scientific research campus of the Howard Hughes Medical Institute that opened in October 2006. The campus is located in Loudoun County, Virginia, near the town of Ashburn. It is known for its scientific research and modern architecture. The current executive director of the laboratory is Nelson Spruston, who is also a vice-president of HHMI. He succeeded Ronald Vale in 2024, who in turn succeeded the initial director Gerald M. Rubin in 2020. The campus was known as "Janelia Farm Research Campus" until 2014.

== Research ==
Most HHMI-funded research supports investigators working at their home institutions. However, some interdisciplinary problems are difficult to address in existing research settings, and Janelia was built as a separate institution to address such problems in neurobiology. As of February 2025, it had 650 employees. They specifically address the identification of general principles governing information processing by neuronal circuits, and the development of imaging technologies and computational methods for image analysis. In 2017, it announced a new research area, mechanistic cognitive neuroscience. In 2026, Janelia announced a new decade-long effort to understand the vertebrate brain by studying the tiny transparent fish Danionella.

At any given time, Janelia supports several large collaborative projects to address needs for data and techniques of interest to a wide scientific community. As of 2021, these included the development of large-scale neuroanatomical data for Drosophila (at the light and electron microscopy levels), a corresponding light level map of the mouse brain, improving the technology of genetically coded fluorescent sensors, and a number of smaller projects. Results include much improved fluorescent calcium sensors and the first entire full-brain image of Drosophila with neuronal resolution.

The center was designed to emulate the unconstrained and collaborative environments at AT&T Bell Laboratories and Cambridge's Laboratory of Molecular Biology. Researchers are on six-year contracts and fully internally funded, independent of traditional research grant funding.

Gerald M. Rubin was the first executive director of Janelia, and saw it from concept through construction to operation. Ronald Vale took over as director in early 2020, followed by Nelson Spruston in 2024. There are roughly fifty research laboratories headed by senior researchers including Jennifer Lippincott-Schwartz, Gerry Rubin, Luke Lavis, and Eric Betzig. Previous lab heads include Karel Svoboda, Barry Dickson, Sean Eddy, Tamir Gonen, Lynn Riddiford, James W. Truman, and Robert Tjian.

== Education and community involvement ==
Janelia's mission also includes education as well as research. Programs include high school, undergraduate, and graduate student programs, the latter in cooperation with Johns Hopkins.

Together with the Loudoun Academy of Science, HHMI donates approximately $1 million annually to support science education throughout Loudoun County Public Schools. Janelia also hosts a quarterly lecture series for members of the public.

== Research Facilities ==
=== Computational infrastructure ===
The storage and computational requirements of modern neuroscience can be extremely demanding. Some two-photon microscopes can generate data at over 5 GB/s. Electron microscopy connectomics can be especially demanding. The FlyEM dataset alone is a 400 TB, 34431 x 39743 x 41407 64-bit image. The analysis of a similar dataset took nearly 7000 GPU hours.

Computational infrastructure available to researchers at Janelia includes a high performance 6000 core cluster with 300 GPUs, 25 petabytes of storage and an off-site data center where data is backed up nightly.

=== Animal facilities ===
An accredited vivarium houses laboratory animals including zebrafish, mice, and rats. Support staff assist with routine care, breeding, and surgeries. Routine care is aided by automation. Several fly flipping robots help maintain Drosophila stocks by transferring them to vials of fresh food. Two robot arms aid in the sanitation of mouse cages. One arm picks dirty cages from a stack and inserts them into an autoclave, the other removes sanitized cages and stacks them.

=== Advanced Imaging Center ===
Scientists from around the world can apply to run their experiments on Janelia developed microscopes (both optical and EM) at the Advanced Imaging Center.

=== Instrument design and construction ===
Janelia hosts a facility jET, for Janelia Experimental Technology, which designs, builds, and tests commercially unavailable instruments, tools, and software.

== Campus ==
The original Janelia Farm house is listed on the National Register of Historic Places, and the property was purchased by HHMI from the Dutch software maker Baan Companies in December 2000. The 281-acre (1.14 km^{2}) main campus features a 900-foot (270 m) long, arc-shaped laboratory known as the Landscape Building. The building, designed by Rafael Viñoly, 270 feet (82 m) wide at the ground floor, is built into a hill and designed to be the primary research facility. A 96-room hotel for conference attendees overlooks a pond and connects to the Landscape Building via a tunnel under Helix drive. Selden Island, a 408-acre (1.65 km^{2}) former sod farm in the Potomac River was added to the campus in 2004 and is popular amongst staff for jogging and recreation.

Many employees live on campus. There are three apartment buildings totaling 240 units—34 single-family townhouses and 21 studio apartments providing housing for more than a quarter of the staff. Other employees commute to Arlington on an HHMI provided shuttle bus. There are extensive fitness facilities, including a yoga studio, bouldering gym, tennis courts, and a soccer field.

Site and landscape design were completed by Dewberry in 2006 and include over four acres of green roof meadow plantings which blend the building into the surrounding site. In 2006, the institute hired landscape architecture firm Lewis Scully Gionet, Inc., to redo some of the previous landscape work which was completed in fall 2008 (and won an Honor Award from the Maryland and Potomac chapters of the American Society of Landscape Architects). This work includes an architectural water feature, expanded path network, and siting of multiple pieces of artwork, as well as comprehensive planting additions. Additional campus-wide landscape improvement designed by LSG Landscape Architecture followed up until now.

== See also ==
- Salk Institute for Biological Studies
- Cold Spring Harbor Laboratory
