= List of microscopists =

This is a list of microscopists by alphabetical order of last name:

- Ernst Abbe
- Giovanni Battista Amici
- Henry Baker
- Francisco Balzarotti
- Joseph Edwin Barnard
- Wynne Edwin Baxter
- Eric Betzig
- Gerd Binnig
- David Cockayne
- Christian Colliex
- Frank Crisp
- Gaia Pigino
- Christian Gottfried Ehrenberg
- Ulrike Endesfelder
- Humberto Fernández Morán
- Clara Franzini-Armstrong
- Franz Josef Giessibl
- Philip Henry Gosse
- Johannes Groenland
- Pieter Harting
- Arthur Hill Hassall
- Stefan Hell
- Harald Hess
- Peter Hirsch
- Archibald Howie
- Sumio Iijima
- Zacharias Janssen
- Alfred Kahl
- Max Knoll
- August Köhler
- Ondrej Krivanek
- Melike Lakadamyali
- Antonie van Leeuwenhoek
- Julia Mahamid
- Laurence D. Marks
- Benjamin Martin
- Matthew Fontaine Maury
- William E. Moerner
- John Howard Mummery
- Peter Nellist
- Johan Sebastiaan Ploem
- John Thomas Quekett
- Edwin John Quekett
- John Randall
- Heinrich Rohrer
- Ernst Ruska
- Helmut Ruska
- Henry Clifton Sorby
- Jan Swammerdam
- Edward Hutchinson Synge
- Ilaria Testa
- Knut Urban
- Jennifer Waters
- M.J. Whelan
- Nestor J. Zaluzec
- Carl Zeiss
- Frits Zernike

== See also ==
- Microscopy
