= Microscopy =

Viewing of objects which are too small to be seen with the naked eye

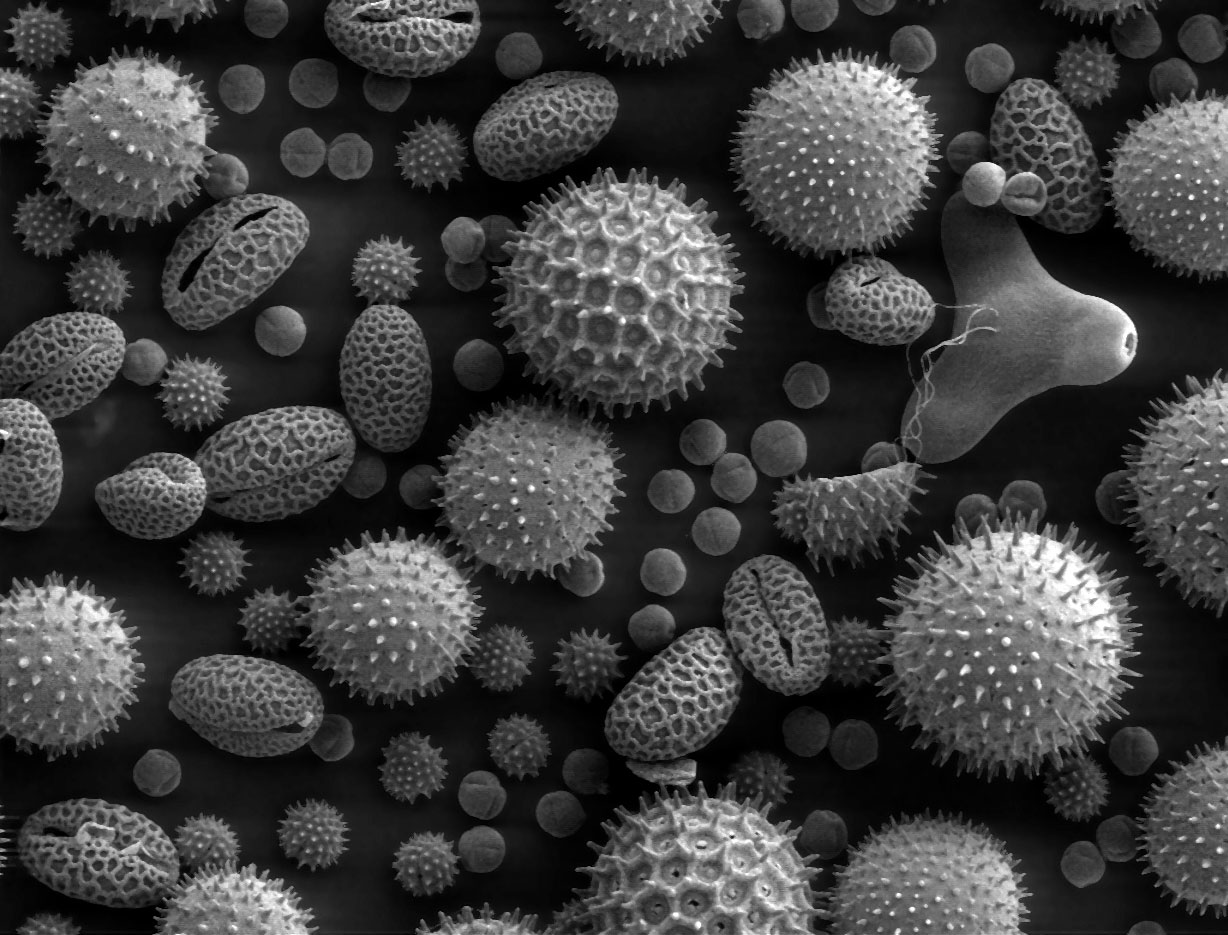
Scanning electron microscope image of pollen

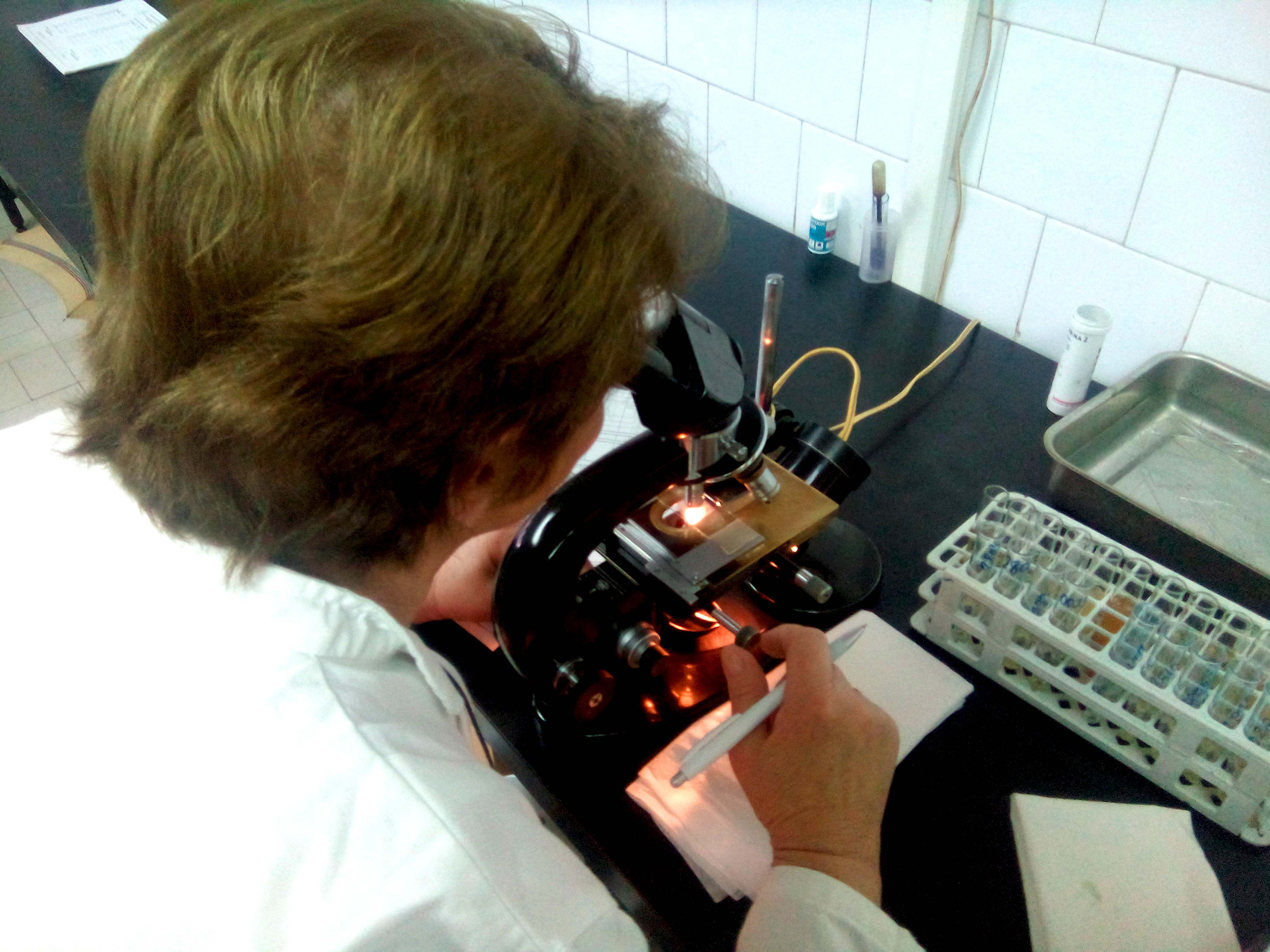
Microscopic examination in a biochemical laboratory

Microscopy is the technical field of using microscopes to view subjects too small to be seen with the naked eye (objects that are not within the resolution range of the normal eye). There are three well-known branches of microscopy: optical, electron, and scanning probe microscopy, along with the emerging field of X-ray microscopy.

Optical microscopy and electron microscopy involve the diffraction, reflection, or refraction of electromagnetic radiation/electron beams interacting with the specimen, and the collection of the scattered radiation or another signal in order to create an image. This process may be carried out by wide-field irradiation of the sample (for example standard light microscopy and transmission electron microscopy) or by scanning a fine beam over the sample (for example confocal laser scanning microscopy and scanning electron microscopy). Scanning probe microscopy involves the interaction of a scanning probe with the surface of the object of interest. The development of microscopy revolutionized biology, gave rise to the field of histology and so remains an essential technique in the life and physical sciences. X-ray microscopy is three-dimensional and non-destructive, allowing for repeated imaging of the same sample for in situ or 4D studies, and providing the ability to "see inside" the sample being studied before sacrificing it to higher resolution techniques. A 3D X-ray microscope uses the technique of computed tomography (microCT), rotating the sample 360 degrees and reconstructing the images. CT is typically carried out with a flat panel display. A 3D X-ray microscope employs a range of objectives, e.g., from 4X to 40X, and can also include a flat panel.

== History ==
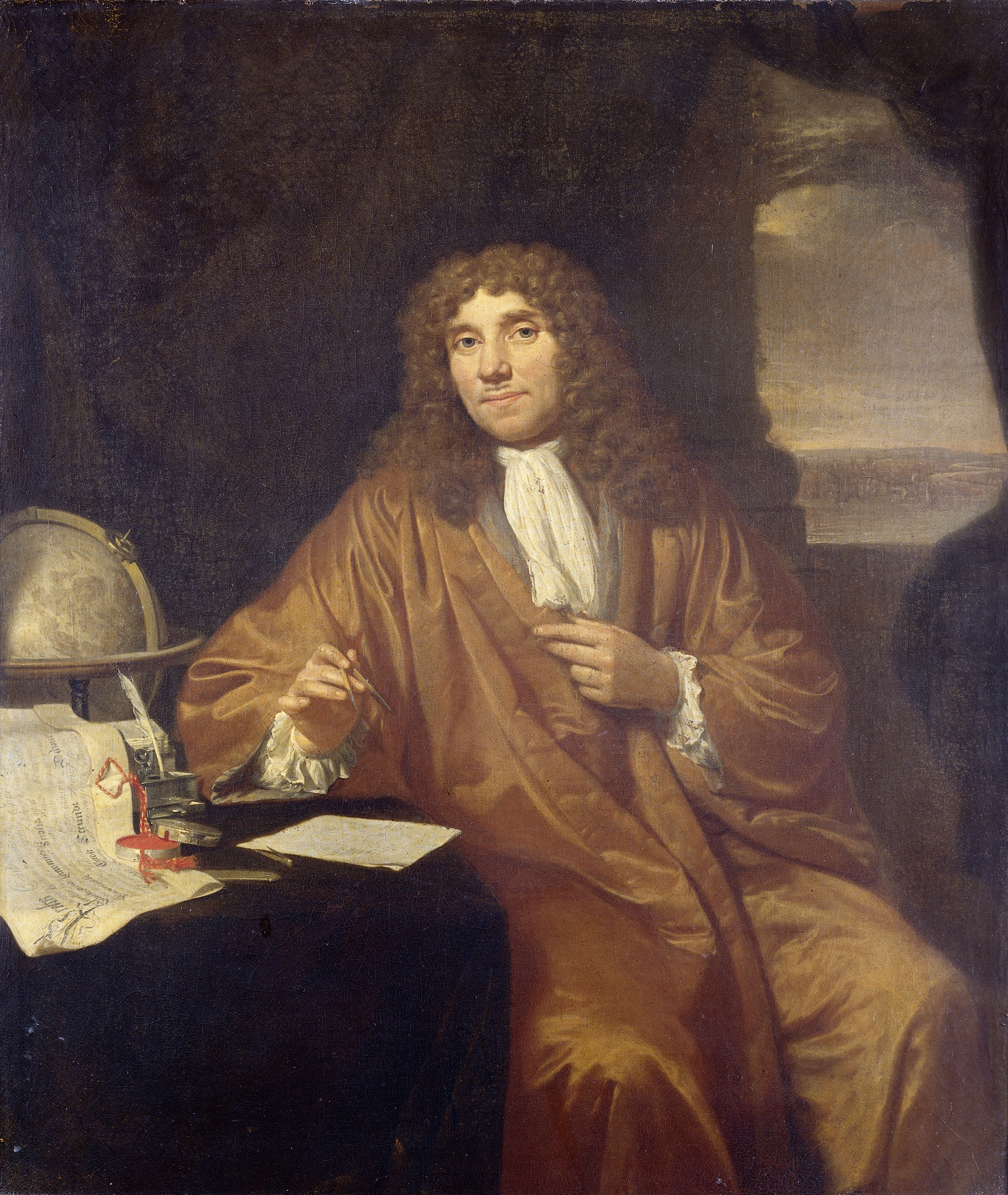
Antonie van Leeuwenhoek (1632–1723)

The field of microscopy (optical microscopy) dates back to at least the 17th-century. Earlier microscopes, single lens magnifying glasses with limited magnification, date at least as far back as the wide spread use of lenses in eyeglasses in the 13th century but more advanced compound microscopes first appeared in Europe around 1620 The earliest practitioners of microscopy include Galileo Galilei, who found in 1610 that he could close focus his telescope to view small objects close up and Cornelis Drebbel, who may have invented the compound microscope around 1620. Antonie van Leeuwenhoek developed a very high magnification simple microscope in the 1670s and is often considered to be the first acknowledged microscopist and microbiologist.

== Optical microscopy ==
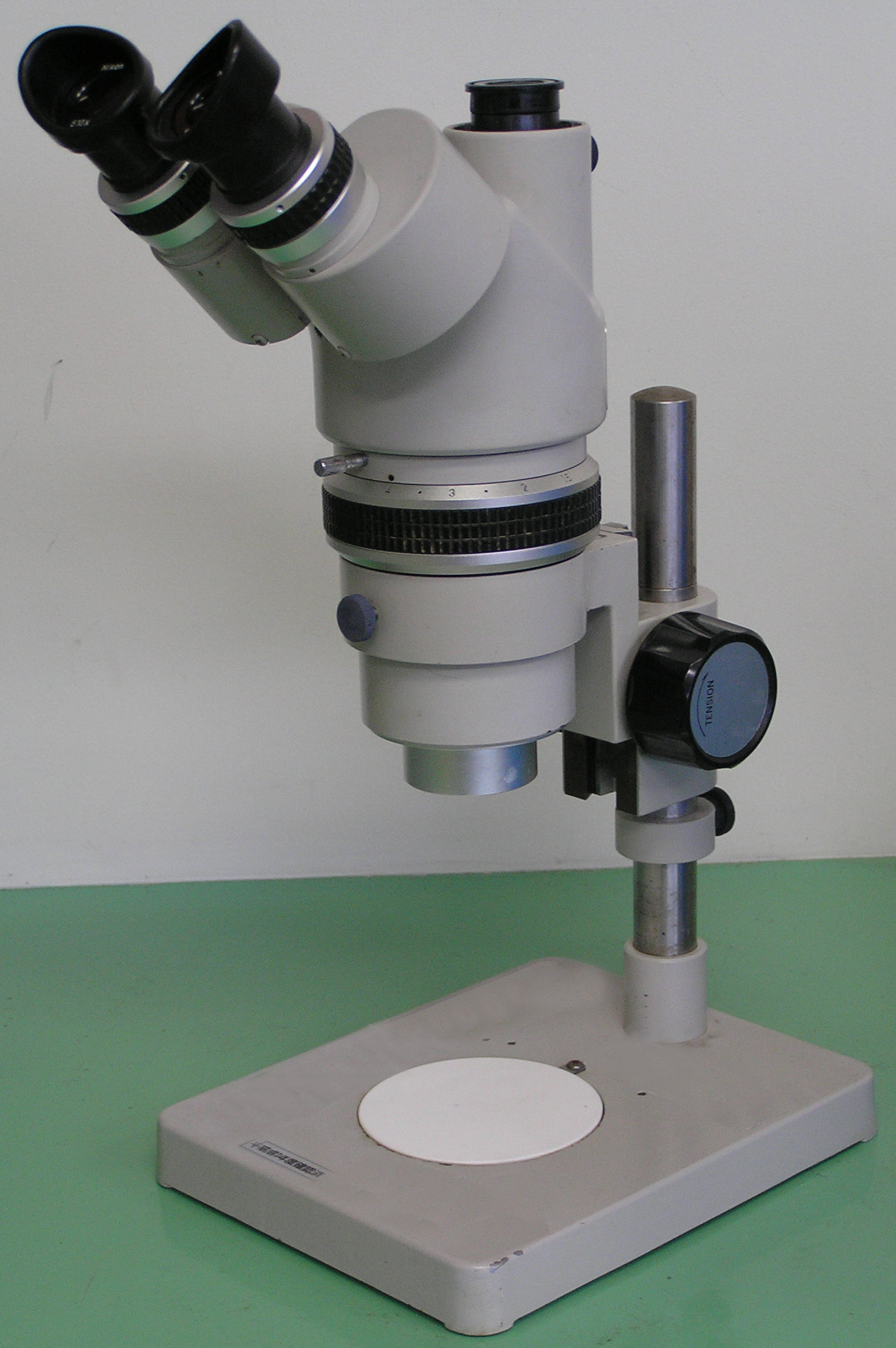
Stereo microscope

Optical or light microscopy involves passing visible light transmitted through or reflected from the sample through a single lens or multiple lenses to allow a magnified view of the sample. The resulting image can be detected directly by the eye, imaged on a photographic plate, or captured digitally. The single lens with its attachments, or the system of lenses and imaging equipment, along with the appropriate lighting equipment, sample stage, and support, makes up the basic light microscope. The most recent development is the digital microscope, which uses a CCD camera to focus on the exhibit of interest. The image is shown on a computer screen, so eye-pieces are unnecessary.

=== Limitations ===
Limitations of standard optical microscopy (bright-field microscopy) lie in three areas:

- The technique can only image dark or strongly refracting objects effectively.
- There is a diffraction-limited resolution depending on incident wavelength; in visible range, the resolution of optical microscopy is limited to approximately 0.2 micrometres (see: microscope) and the practical magnification limit to ~1500x.
- Out-of-focus light from points outside the focal plane reduces image clarity.

Live cells in particular generally lack sufficient contrast to be studied successfully, since the internal structures of the cell are colorless and transparent. The most common way to increase contrast is to stain the structures with selective dyes, but this often involves killing and fixing the sample. Staining may also introduce artifacts, which are apparent structural details that are caused by the processing of the specimen and are thus not features of the specimen. In general, these techniques make use of differences in the refractive index of cell structures. Bright-field microscopy is comparable to looking through a glass window: one sees not the glass but merely the dirt on the glass. There is a difference, as glass is a denser material, and this creates a difference in phase of the light passing through. The human eye is not sensitive to this difference in phase, but clever optical solutions have been devised to change this difference in phase into a difference in amplitude (light intensity).

=== Techniques ===
To improve specimen contrast or highlight structures in a sample, special techniques must be used. A huge selection of microscopy techniques are available to increase contrast or label a sample.

Four examples of transillumination techniques used to generate contrast in a sample of tissue paper. 1.559 μm/pixel.

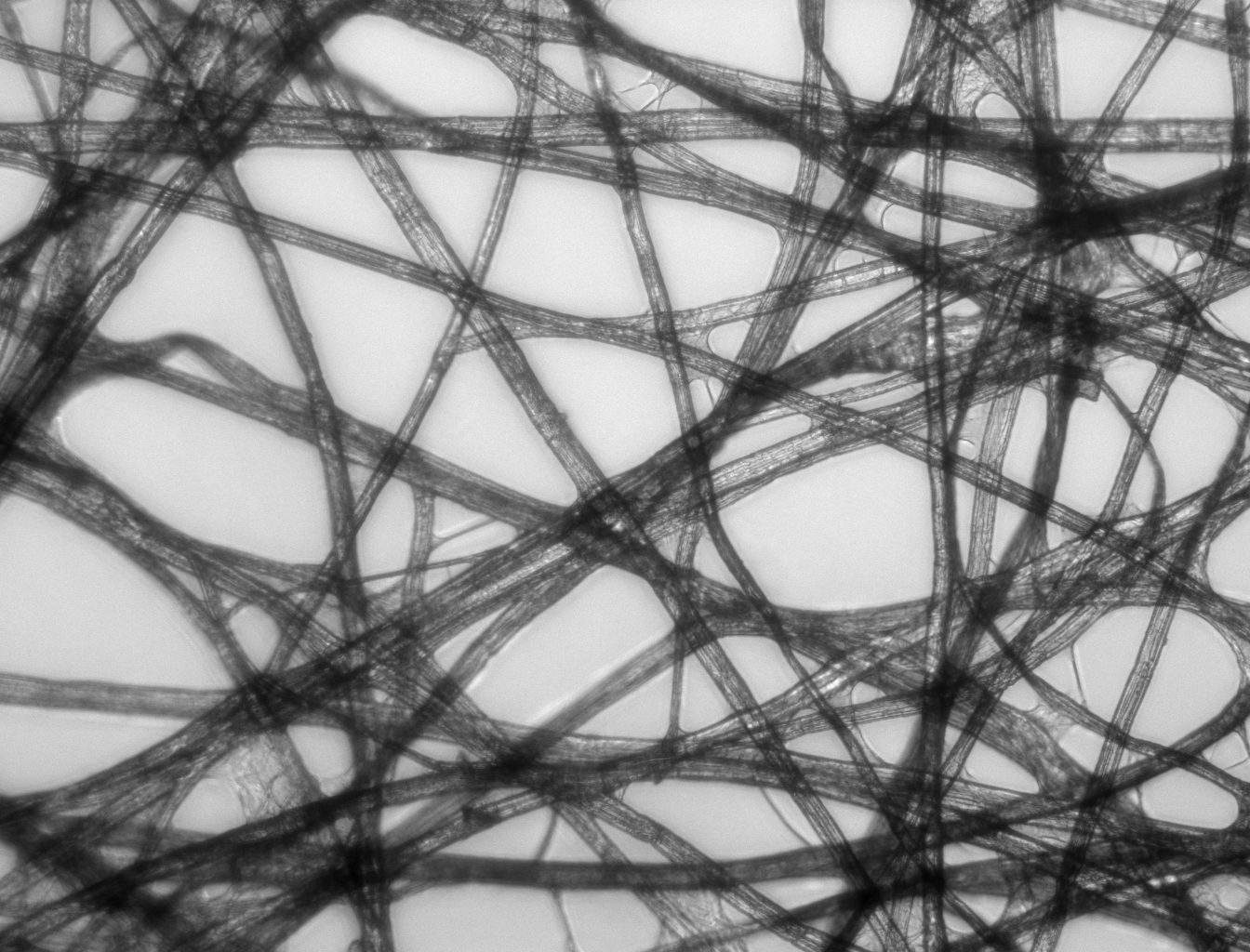
Bright-field illumination, sample contrast comes from absorbance of light in the sample

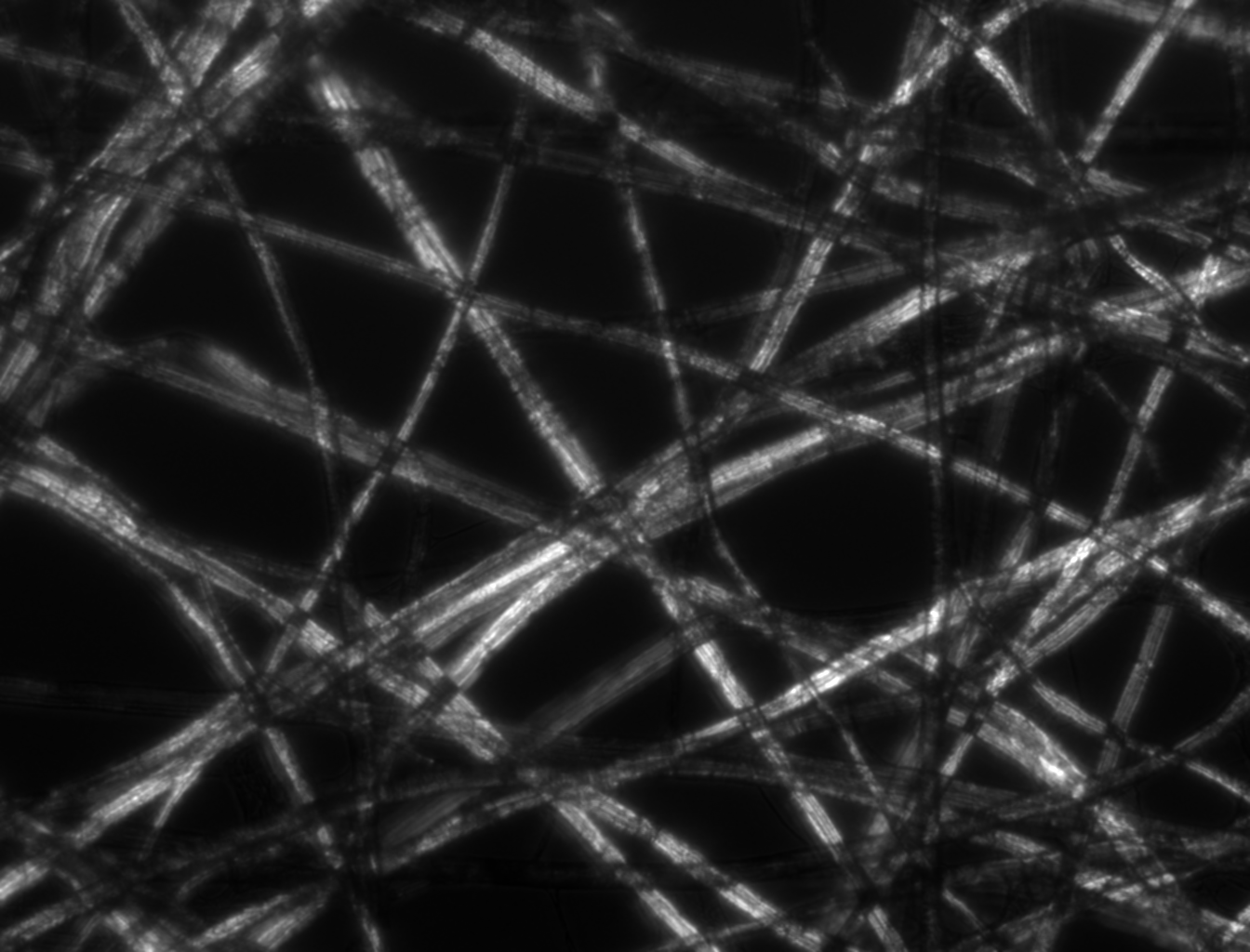
Cross-polarized light illumination, sample contrast comes from rotation of polarized light through the sample

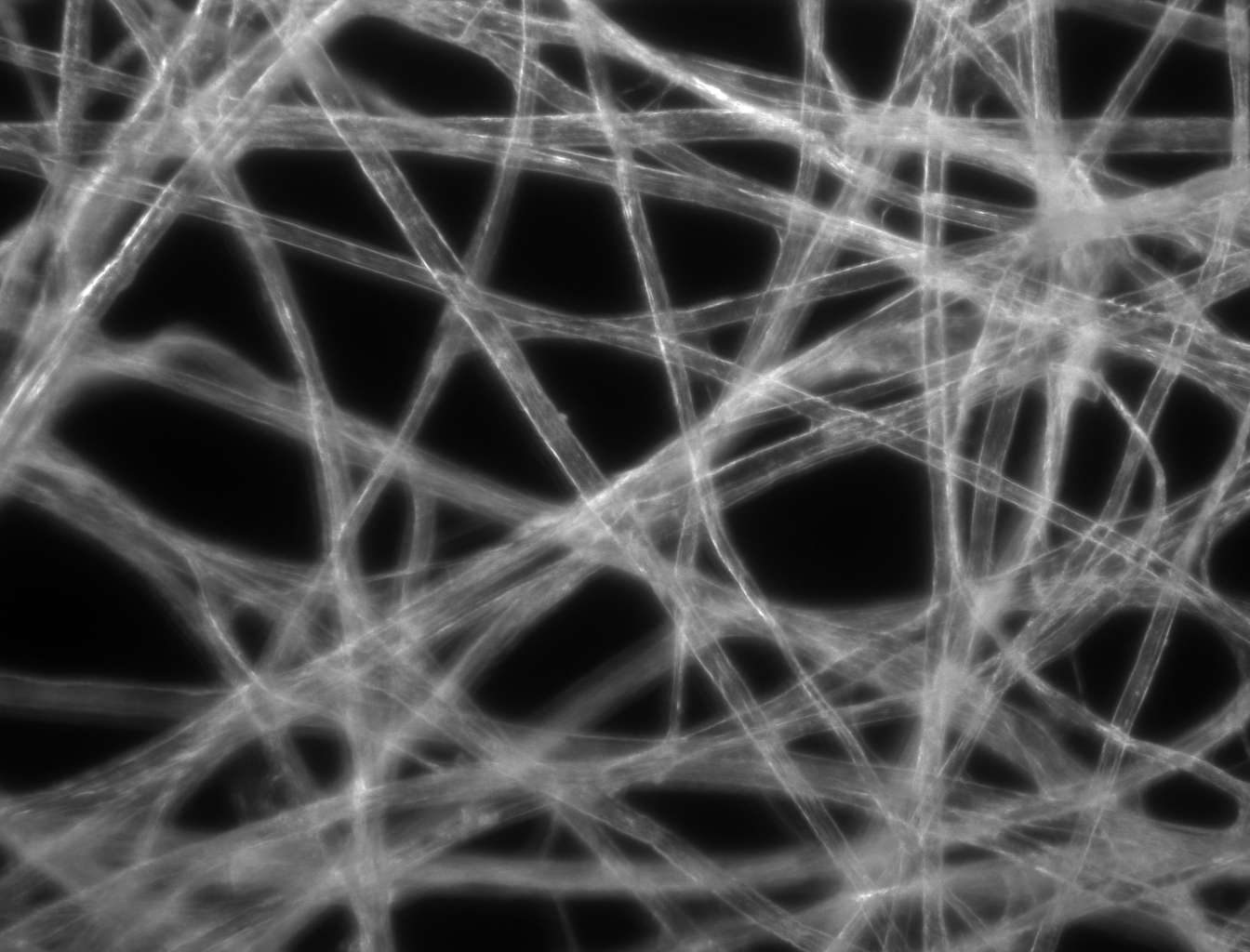
Dark-field illumination, sample contrast comes from light scattered by the sample

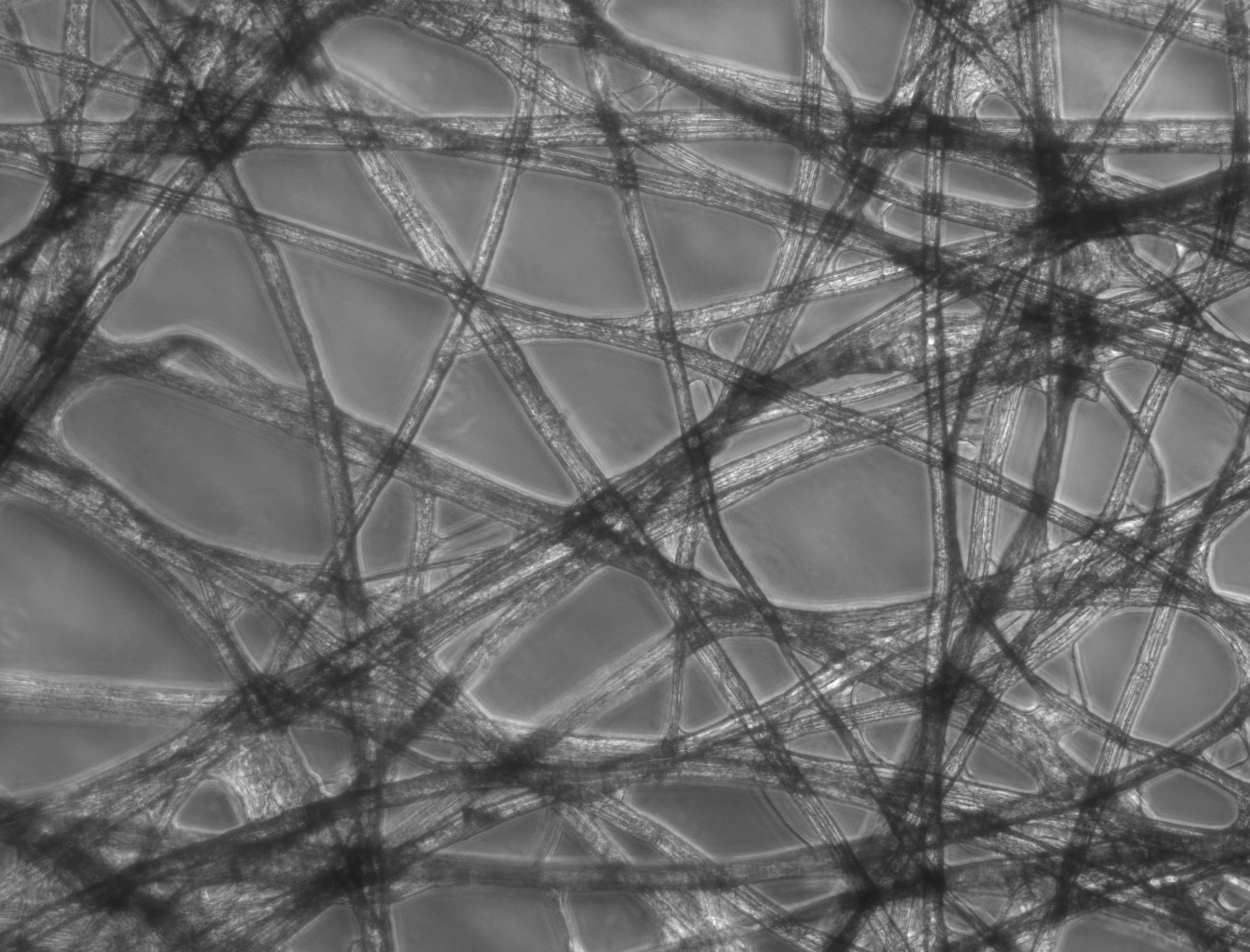
Phase-contrast illumination, sample contrast comes from interference of different path lengths of light through the sample

==== Bright field ====
Bright-field microscopy is the simplest of all the light microscopy techniques. Sample illumination is via transmitted white light, i.e. illuminated from below and observed from above. Limitations include low contrast of most biological samples and low apparent resolution due to the blur of out-of-focus material. The simplicity of the technique and the minimal sample preparation required are significant advantages.

==== Oblique illumination ====
The use of oblique (from the side) illumination gives the image a three-dimensional appearance and can highlight otherwise invisible features. A more recent technique based on this method is Hoffmann's modulation contrast, a system found on inverted microscopes for use in cell culture. Oblique illumination enhances contrast even in clear specimens; however, because light enters off-axis, the position of an object will appear to shift as the focus is changed. This limitation makes techniques like optical sectioning or accurate measurement on the z-axis impossible.

==== Dark field ====
Dark-field microscopy is a technique for improving the contrast of unstained, transparent specimens. Dark-field illumination uses a carefully aligned light source to minimize the quantity of directly transmitted (unscattered) light entering the image plane, collecting only the light scattered by the sample. Dark field can dramatically improve image contrast – especially of transparent objects – while requiring little equipment setup or sample preparation. However, the technique suffers from low light intensity in the final image of many biological samples and continues to be affected by low apparent resolution.

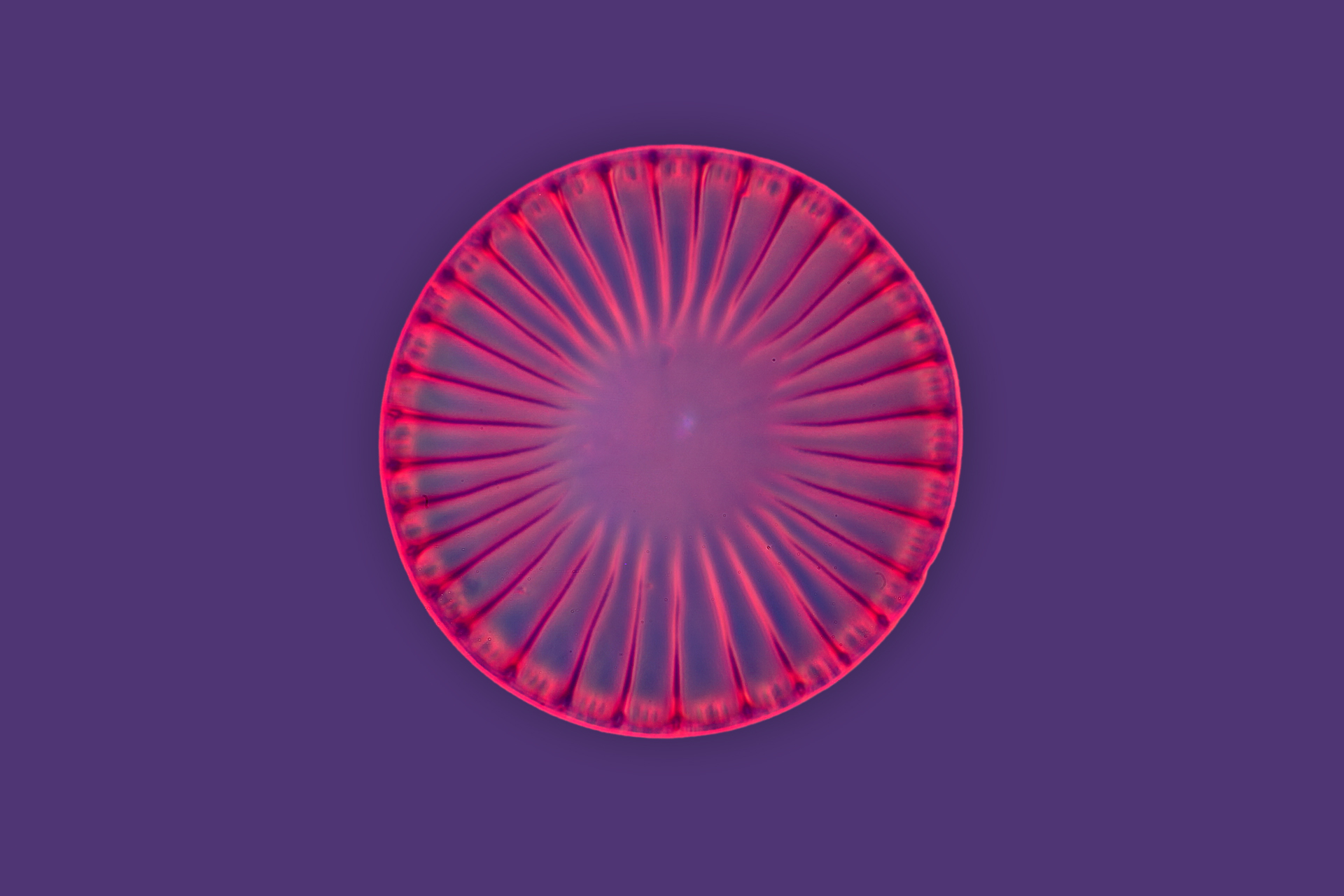
A diatom under Rheinberg illumination

Rheinberg illumination is a variant of dark-field illumination in which transparent, colored filters are inserted just before the condenser so that light rays at high aperture are differently colored than those at low aperture (i.e., the background to the specimen may be blue while the object appears self-luminous red). Other color combinations are possible, but their effectiveness is quite variable.

==== Dispersion staining ====
Dispersion staining is an optical technique that results in a colored image of a colorless object. This is an optical staining technique and requires no stains or dyes to produce a color effect. There are five different microscope configurations used in the broader technique of dispersion staining. They include brightfield Becke line, oblique, darkfield, phase contrast, and objective stop dispersion staining.

==== Phase contrast ====
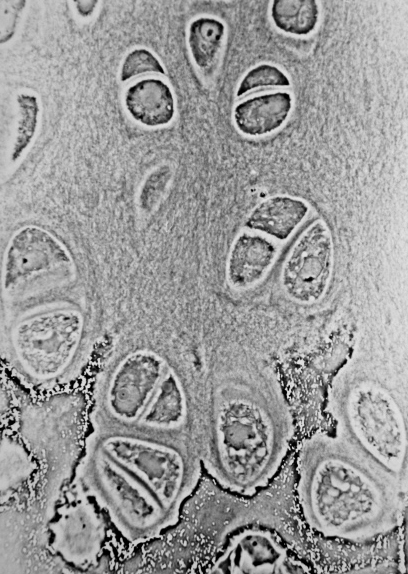
Phase-contrast light micrograph of undecalcified hyaline cartilage showing chondrocytes and organelles, lacunae and extracellular matrix

In electron microscopy: Phase-contrast imaging

More sophisticated techniques will show proportional differences in optical density. Phase contrast is a widely used technique that shows differences in refractive index as difference in contrast. It was developed by the Dutch physicist Frits Zernike in the 1930s (for which he was awarded the Nobel Prize in 1953). The nucleus in a cell for example will show up darkly against the surrounding cytoplasm. Contrast is excellent; however it is not for use with thick objects. Frequently, a halo is formed even around small objects, which obscures detail. The system consists of a circular annulus in the condenser, which produces a cone of light. This cone is superimposed on a similar sized ring within the phase-objective. Every objective has a different size ring, so for every objective another condenser setting has to be chosen. The ring in the objective has special optical properties: it, first of all, reduces the direct light in intensity, but more importantly, it creates an artificial phase difference of about a quarter wavelength. As the physical properties of this direct light have changed, interference with the diffracted light occurs, resulting in the phase-contrast image. One disadvantage of phase-contrast microscopy is halo formation (halo-light ring).

==== Differential interference contrast ====
Superior and much more expensive is the use of interference contrast. Differences in optical density will show up as differences in relief. A nucleus within a cell will actually show up as a globule in the most often used differential interference contrast system according to Georges Nomarski. However, it has to be kept in mind that this is an optical effect, and the relief does not necessarily resemble the true shape. Contrast is very good and the condenser aperture can be used fully open, thereby reducing the depth of field and maximizing resolution.

The system consists of a special prism (Nomarski prism, Wollaston prism) in the condenser that splits light in an ordinary and an extraordinary beam. The spatial difference between the two beams is minimal (less than the maximum resolution of the objective). After passage through the specimen, the beams are reunited by a similar prism in the objective.

In a homogeneous specimen, there is no difference between the two beams, and no contrast is being generated. However, near a refractive boundary (say a nucleus within the cytoplasm), the difference between the ordinary and the extraordinary beam will generate a relief in the image. Differential interference contrast requires a polarized light source to function; two polarizing filters have to be fitted in the light path, one below the condenser (the polarizer), and the other above the objective (the analyzer).

Note: In cases where the optical design of a microscope produces an appreciable lateral separation of the two beams we have the case of classical interference microscopy, which does not result in relief images, but can nevertheless be used for the quantitative determination of mass-thicknesses of microscopic objects.

==== Interference reflection ====
An additional technique using interference is interference reflection microscopy (also known as reflected interference contrast, or RIC). It relies on cell adhesion to the slide to produce an interference signal. If there is no cell attached to the glass, there will be no interference.

Interference reflection microscopy can be obtained by using the same elements used by DIC, but without the prisms. Also, the light that is being detected is reflected and not transmitted as it is when DIC is employed.

==== Fluorescence ====
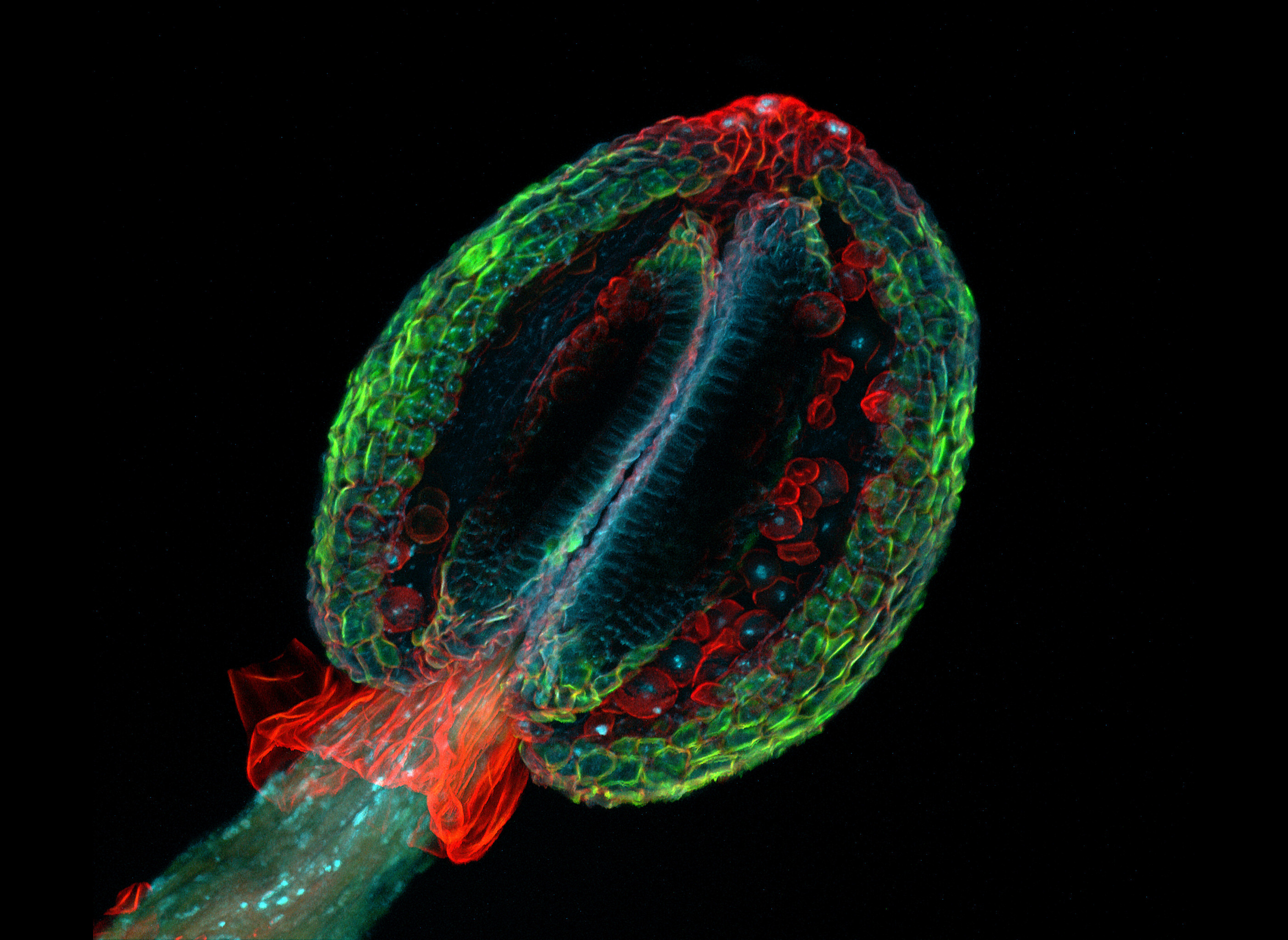
Images may also contain artifacts. This is a confocal laser scanning fluorescence micrograph of thale cress anther (part of stamen). The picture shows among other things a nice red flowing collar-like structure just below the anther. However, an intact thale cress stamen does not have such collar, this is a fixation artifact: the stamen has been cut below the picture frame, and epidermis (upper layer of cells) of stamen stalk has peeled off, forming a non-characteristic structure. Photo: Heiti Paves from Tallinn University of Technology.

When certain compounds are illuminated with high energy light, they emit light of a lower frequency. This effect is known as fluorescence. Often specimens show their characteristic autofluorescence image, based on their chemical makeup.

This method is of critical importance in the modern life sciences, as it can be extremely sensitive, allowing the detection of single molecules. Many fluorescent dyes can be used to stain structures or chemical compounds. One powerful method is the combination of antibodies coupled to a fluorophore as in immunostaining. Examples of commonly used fluorophores are fluorescein or rhodamine.

The antibodies can be tailor-made for a chemical compound. For example, one strategy often in use is the artificial production of proteins, based on the genetic code (DNA). These proteins can then be used to immunize rabbits, forming antibodies which bind to the protein. The antibodies are then coupled chemically to a fluorophore and used to trace the proteins in the cells under study.

Highly efficient fluorescent proteins such as the green fluorescent protein (GFP) have been developed using the molecular biology technique of gene fusion, a process that links the expression of the fluorescent compound to that of the target protein. This combined fluorescent protein is, in general, non-toxic to the organism and rarely interferes with the function of the protein under study. Genetically modified cells or organisms directly express the fluorescently tagged proteins, which enables the study of the function of the original protein in vivo.

Growth of protein crystals results in both protein and salt crystals. Both are colorless and microscopic. Recovery of the protein crystals requires imaging which can be done by the intrinsic fluorescence of the protein or by using transmission microscopy. Both methods require an ultraviolet microscope as proteins absorbs light at 280 nm. Protein will also fluorescence at approximately 353 nm when excited with 280 nm light.

Since fluorescence emission differs in wavelength (color) from the excitation light, an ideal fluorescent image shows only the structure of interest that was labeled with the fluorescent dye. This high specificity led to the widespread use of fluorescence light microscopy in biomedical research. Different fluorescent dyes can be used to stain different biological structures, which can then be detected simultaneously, while still being specific due to the individual color of the dye.

To block the excitation light from reaching the observer or the detector, filter sets of high quality are needed. These typically consist of an excitation filter selecting the range of excitation wavelengths, a dichroic mirror, and an emission filter blocking the excitation light. Most fluorescence microscopes are operated in the Epi-illumination mode (illumination and detection from one side of the sample) to further decrease the amount of excitation light entering the detector.

See also: total internal reflection fluorescence microscope Neuroscience

==== Confocal ====
Confocal laser scanning microscopy uses a focused laser beam (e.g. 488 nm) that is scanned across the sample to excite fluorescence in a point-by-point fashion. The emitted light is directed through a pinhole to prevent out-of-focus light from reaching the detector, typically a photomultiplier tube. The image is constructed in a computer, plotting the measured fluorescence intensities according to the position of the excitation laser. Compared to full sample illumination, confocal microscopy gives slightly higher lateral resolution and significantly improves optical sectioning (axial resolution). Confocal microscopy is, therefore, commonly used where 3D structure is important.

A subclass of confocal microscopes are spinning disc microscopes which are able to scan multiple points simultaneously across the sample. A corresponding disc with pinholes rejects out-of-focus light. The light detector in a spinning disc microscope is a digital camera, typically EM-CCD or sCMOS.

==== Two-photon microscopy ====
A two-photon microscope is also a laser-scanning microscope, but instead of UV, blue or green laser light, a pulsed infrared laser is used for excitation. Only in the tiny focus of the laser is the intensity high enough to generate fluorescence by two-photon excitation, which means that no out-of-focus fluorescence is generated, and no pinhole is necessary to clean up the image. This allows imaging deep in scattering tissue, where a confocal microscope would not be able to collect photons efficiently. Two-photon microscopes with wide-field detection are frequently used for functional imaging, e.g. calcium imaging, in brain tissue. They are marketed as Multiphoton microscopes by several companies, although the gains of using 3-photon instead of 2-photon excitation are marginal.

==== Single-plane illumination microscopy and light-sheet fluorescence microscopy ====
Using a plane of light formed by focusing light through a cylindrical lens at a narrow angle or by scanning a line of light in a plane perpendicular to the axis of objective, high-resolution optical sections can be taken. Single-plane illumination, or light-sheet illumination, is also accomplished using beam shaping techniques incorporating multiple-prism beam expanders. The images are captured by CCDs. These variants allow very fast and high signal to noise ratio image capture.

==== Wide-field multiphoton microscopy ====
Wide-field multiphoton microscopy refers to an optical non-linear imaging technique in which a large area of the object is illuminated and imaged without the need for scanning. High intensities are required to induce non-linear optical processes such as two-photon fluorescence or second-harmonic generation. In scanning multiphoton microscopes the high intensities are achieved by tightly focusing the light, and the image is obtained by beam scanning. In wide-field multiphoton microscopy the high intensities are best achieved using an optically amplified pulsed laser source to attain a large field of view (~100 μm). The image in this case is obtained as a single frame with a CCD camera without the need of scanning, making the technique particularly useful to visualize dynamic processes simultaneously across the object of interest. With wide-field multiphoton microscopy the frame rate can be increased up to a 1000-fold compared to multiphoton scanning microscopy. In scattering tissue, however, image quality rapidly degrades with increasing depth.

==== Deconvolution ====
Fluorescence microscopy is a powerful technique to show specifically labeled structures within a complex environment and to provide three-dimensional information of biological structures. However, this information is blurred by the fact that, upon illumination, all fluorescently labeled structures emit light, irrespective of whether they are in focus or not. So an image of a certain structure is always blurred by the contribution of light from structures that are out of focus. This phenomenon results in a loss of contrast especially when using objectives with a high resolving power, typically oil immersion objectives with a high numerical aperture.

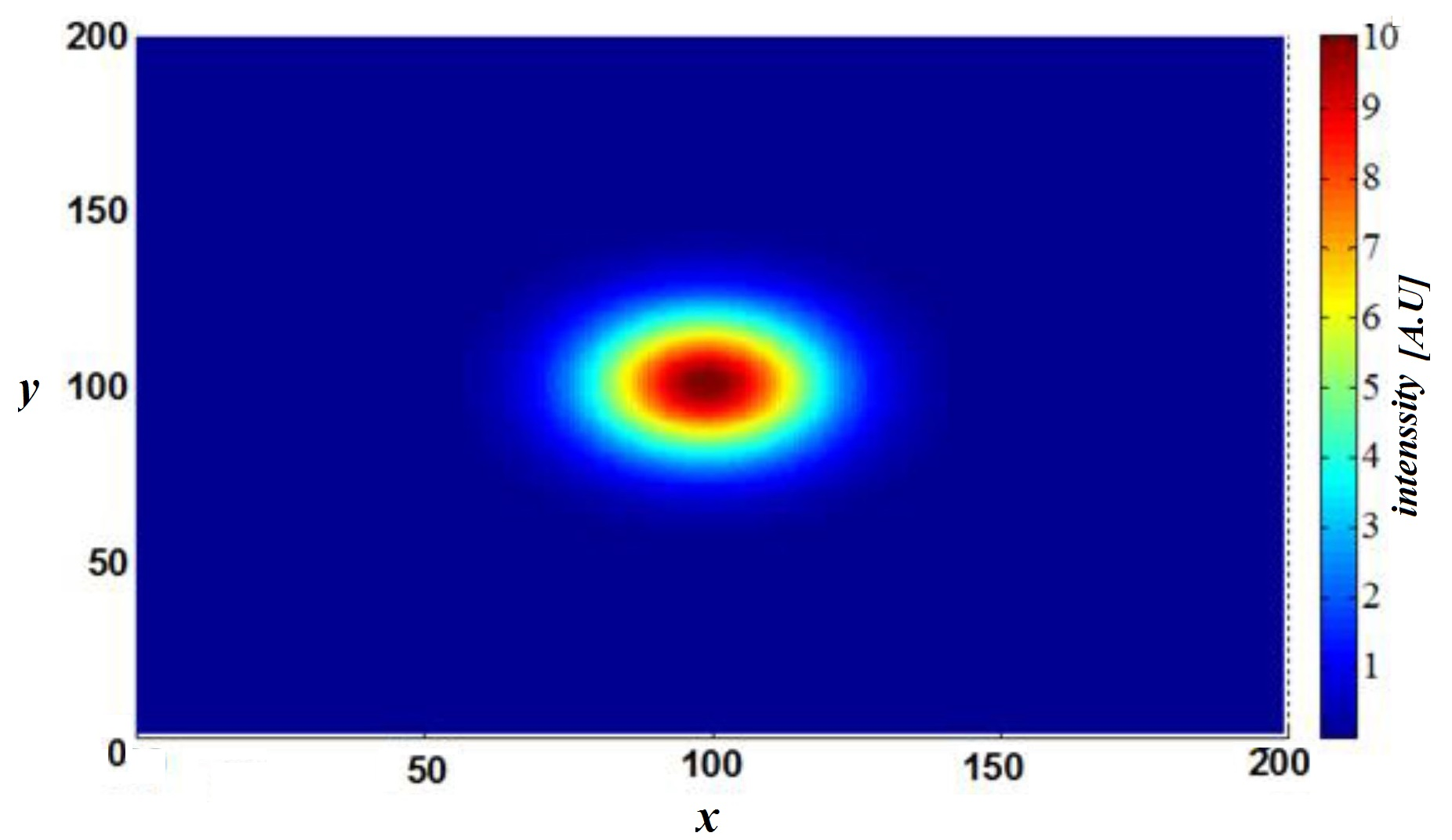
Mathematically modeled Point Spread Function of a pulsed THz laser imaging system.

However, blurring is not caused by random processes, such as light scattering, but can be well defined by the optical properties of the image formation in the microscope imaging system. If one considers a small fluorescent light source (essentially a bright spot), light coming from this spot spreads out further from our perspective as the spot becomes more out of focus. Under ideal conditions, this produces an "hourglass" shape of this point source in the third (axial) dimension. This shape is called the point spread function (PSF) of the microscope imaging system. Since any fluorescence image is made up of a large number of such small fluorescent light sources, the image is said to be "convolved by the point spread function". The mathematically modeled PSF of a terahertz laser pulsed imaging system is shown on the right.

The output of an imaging system can be described using the equation:

$s(x,y) = PSF(x,y) * o(x,y) + n$

Where n is the additive noise. Knowing this point spread function means that it is possible to reverse this process to a certain extent by computer-based methods commonly known as deconvolution microscopy. There are various algorithms available for 2D or 3D deconvolution. They can be roughly classified in nonrestorative and restorative methods. While the nonrestorative methods can improve contrast by removing out-of-focus light from focal planes, only the restorative methods can actually reassign light to its proper place of origin. Processing fluorescent images in this manner can be an advantage over directly acquiring images without out-of-focus light, such as images from confocal microscopy, because light signals otherwise eliminated become useful information. For 3D deconvolution, one typically provides a series of images taken from different focal planes (called a Z-stack) plus the knowledge of the PSF, which can be derived either experimentally or theoretically from knowing all contributing parameters of the microscope.

=== Sub-diffraction techniques ===
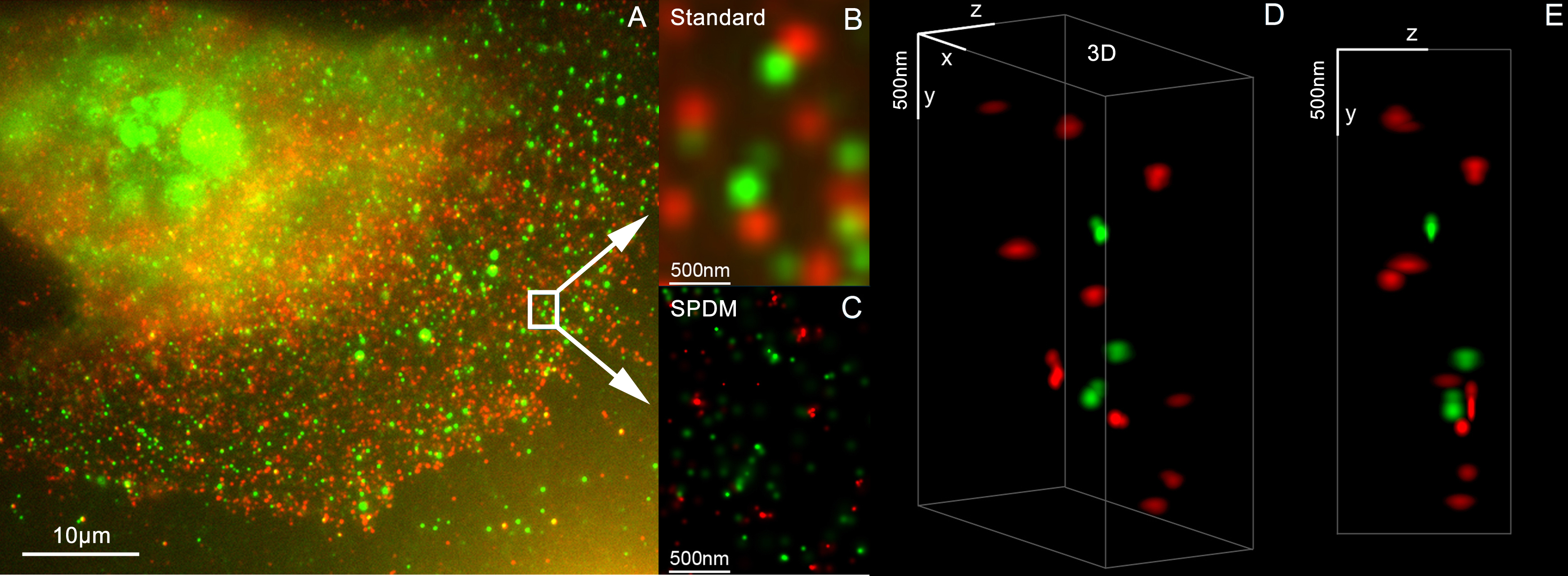
Example of super-resolution microscopy. Image of Her3 and Her2, target of the breast cancer drug Trastuzumab, within a cancer cell.

A multitude of super-resolution microscopy techniques have been developed in recent times which circumvent the diffraction limit.

This is mostly achieved by imaging a sufficiently static sample multiple times and either modifying the excitation light or observing stochastic changes in the image. The deconvolution methods described in the previous section, which removes the PSF induced blur and assigns a mathematically 'correct' origin of light, are used, albeit with slightly different understanding of what the value of a pixel mean. Assuming most of the time, one single fluorophore contributes to one single blob on one single taken image, the blobs in the images can be replaced with their calculated position, vastly improving resolution to well below the diffraction limit.

To realize such assumption, Knowledge of and chemical control over fluorophore photophysics is at the core of these techniques, by which resolutions of ~20 nanometers are obtained.

=== Serial time-encoded amplified microscopy ===
Serial time encoded amplified microscopy (STEAM) is an imaging method that provides ultrafast shutter speed and frame rate, by using optical image amplification to circumvent the fundamental trade-off between sensitivity and speed, and a single-pixel photodetector to eliminate the need for a detector array and readout time limitations The method is at least 1000 times faster than the state-of-the-art CCD and CMOS cameras. Consequently, it is potentially useful for scientific, industrial, and biomedical applications that require high image acquisition rates, including real-time diagnosis and evaluation of shockwaves, microfluidics, MEMS, and laser surgery.

=== Extensions ===
Most modern instruments provide simple solutions for micro-photography and image recording electronically. However such capabilities are not always present and the more experienced microscopist may prefer a hand drawn image to a photograph. This is because a microscopist with knowledge of the subject can accurately convert a three-dimensional image into a precise two-dimensional drawing. In a photograph or other image capture system however, only one thin plane is ever in good focus.

The creation of accurate micrographs requires a microscopical technique using a monocular eyepiece. It is essential that both eyes are open and that the eye that is not observing down the microscope is instead concentrated on a sheet of paper on the bench besides the microscope. With practice, and without moving the head or eyes, it is possible to accurately trace the observed shapes by simultaneously "seeing" the pencil point in the microscopical image.

=== Other enhancements ===
Microspectroscopy:spectroscopy with a microscope

=== X-ray ===
As resolution depends on the wavelength of the light. Electron microscopy has been developed since the 1930s that use electron beams instead of light. Because of the much smaller wavelength of the electron beam, resolution is far higher.

Though less common, X-ray microscopy has also been developed since the late 1940s. The resolution of X-ray microscopy lies between that of light microscopy and electron microscopy.

== Electron microscopy ==
Until the invention of sub-diffraction microscopy, the wavelength of the light limited the resolution of traditional microscopy to around 0.2 micrometers. In order to gain higher resolution, the use of an electron beam with a far smaller wavelength is used in electron microscopes.

- Transmission electron microscopy (TEM) is quite similar to the compound light microscope, by sending an electron beam through a very thin slice of the specimen. The resolution limit in 2005 was around 0.05 nanometer and has not increased appreciably since that time.
- Scanning electron microscopy (SEM) visualizes details on the surfaces of specimens and gives a very nice 3D view. It gives results much like those of the stereo light microscope. The best resolution for SEM in 2011 was 0.4 nanometer.

Electron microscopes equipped for X-ray spectroscopy can provide qualitative and quantitative elemental analysis. This type of electron microscope, also known as analytical electron microscope, can be a very powerful tool for investigation of nanomaterials.

== Scanning probe microscopy ==
This is a sub-diffraction technique. Examples of scanning probe microscopes are the atomic force microscope (AFM), the scanning tunneling microscope, the photonic force microscope and the recurrence tracking microscope. All such methods use the physical contact of a solid probe tip to scan the surface of an object, which is supposed to be almost flat.

=== Ultrasonic force ===
Ultrasonic force microscopy (UFM) has been developed in order to improve the details and image contrast on "flat" areas of interest where AFM images are limited in contrast. The combination of AFM-UFM allows a near field acoustic microscopic image to be generated. The AFM tip is used to detect the ultrasonic waves and overcomes the limitation of wavelength that occurs in acoustic microscopy. By using the elastic changes under the AFM tip, an image of much greater detail than the AFM topography can be generated.

Ultrasonic force microscopy allows the local mapping of elasticity in atomic force microscopy by the application of ultrasonic vibration to the cantilever or sample. To analyze the results of ultrasonic force microscopy in a quantitative fashion, a force-distance curve measurement is done with ultrasonic vibration applied to the cantilever base, and the results are compared with a model of the cantilever dynamics and tip-sample interaction based on the finite-difference technique.

== Ultraviolet microscopy ==
Ultraviolet microscopes have two main purposes. The first is to use the shorter wavelength of ultraviolet electromagnetic energy to improve the image resolution beyond that of the diffraction limit of standard optical microscopes. This technique is used for non-destructive inspection of devices with very small features such as those found in modern semiconductors. The second application for UV microscopes is contrast enhancement where the response of individual samples is enhanced, relative to their surrounding, due to the interaction of light with the molecules within the sample itself. One example is in the growth of protein crystals. Protein crystals are formed in salt solutions. As salt and protein crystals are both formed in the growth process, and both are commonly transparent to the human eye, they cannot be differentiated with a standard optical microscope. As the tryptophan of protein absorbs light at 280 nm, imaging with a UV microscope with 280 nm bandpass filters makes it simple to differentiate between the two types of crystals. The protein crystals appear dark while the salt crystals are transparent.

== Infrared microscopy ==
The term infrared microscopy refers to microscopy performed at infrared wavelengths. In the typical instrument configuration, a Fourier Transform Infrared Spectrometer (FTIR) is combined with an optical microscope and an infrared detector. The infrared detector can be a single point detector, a linear array or a 2D focal plane array. FTIR provides the ability to perform chemical analysis via infrared spectroscopy and the microscope and point or array detector enable this chemical analysis to be spatially resolved, i.e. performed at different regions of the sample. As such, the technique is also called infrared microspectroscopy An alternative architecture called Laser Direct Infrared (LDIR) Imaging involves the combination of a tuneable infrared light source and single point detector on a flying objective. This technique is frequently used for infrared chemical imaging, where the image contrast is determined by the response of individual sample regions to particular IR wavelengths selected by the user, usually specific IR absorption bands and associated molecular resonances. A key limitation of conventional infrared microspectroscopy is that the spatial resolution is diffraction-limited. Specifically the spatial resolution is limited to a figure related to the wavelength of the light. For practical IR microscopes, the spatial resolution is limited to 1–3x the wavelength, depending on the specific technique and instrument used. For mid-IR wavelengths, this sets a practical spatial resolution limit of ~3-30 μm.

IR versions of sub-diffraction microscopy also exist. These include IR Near-field scanning optical microscope (NSOM), photothermal microspectroscopy and atomic force microscope based infrared spectroscopy (AFM-IR), as well as scattering-type Scanning Near-field Optical Microscopy (s-SNOM) & nano-FTIR that provide nanoscale spatial resolution at IR wavelengths.

== Digital holographic microscopy ==
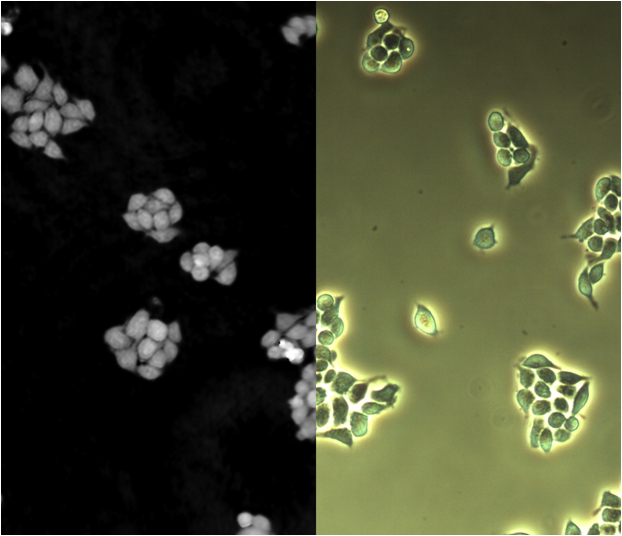
Human cells imaged by DHM phase shift (left) and phase-contrast microscopy (right)

In digital holographic microscopy (DHM), interfering wave fronts from a coherent (monochromatic) light-source are recorded on a sensor. The image is digitally reconstructed by a computer from the recorded hologram. Besides the ordinary bright-field image, a phase shift image is created.

DHM can operate both in reflection and transmission mode. In reflection mode, the phase shift image provides a relative distance measurement and thus represents a topography map of the reflecting surface. In transmission mode, the phase shift image provides a label-free quantitative measurement of the optical thickness of the specimen. Phase shift images of biological cells are very similar to images of stained cells and have successfully been analyzed by high content analysis software.

A unique feature of DHM is the ability to adjust focus after the image is recorded, since all focus planes are recorded simultaneously by the hologram. This feature makes it possible to image moving particles in a volume or to rapidly scan a surface. Another attractive feature is The ability of DHM to use low cost optics by correcting optical aberrations by software.

== Digital pathology (virtual microscopy) ==
Digital pathology is an image-based information environment enabled by computer technology that allows for the management of information generated from a digital slide. Digital pathology is enabled in part by virtual microscopy, which is the practice of converting glass slides into digital slides that can be viewed, managed, and analyzed.

== Laser microscopy ==
Laser microscopy is a rapidly growing field that uses laser illumination sources in various forms of microscopy. For instance, laser microscopy focused on biological applications uses ultrashort pulse lasers, in a number of techniques labeled as nonlinear microscopy, saturation microscopy, and two-photon excitation microscopy.

High-intensity, short-pulse laboratory x-ray lasers have been under development for several years. When this technology comes to fruition, it will be possible to obtain magnified three-dimensional images of elementary biological structures in the living state at a precisely defined instant. For optimum contrast between water and protein and for best sensitivity and resolution, the laser should be tuned near the nitrogen line at about 0.3 nanometers. Resolution will be limited mainly by the hydrodynamic expansion that occurs while the necessary number of photons is being registered. Thus, while the specimen is destroyed by the exposure, its configuration can be captured before it explodes.

Scientists have been working on practical designs and prototypes for x-ray holographic microscopes, despite the prolonged development of the appropriate laser.

== Photoacoustic microscopy ==
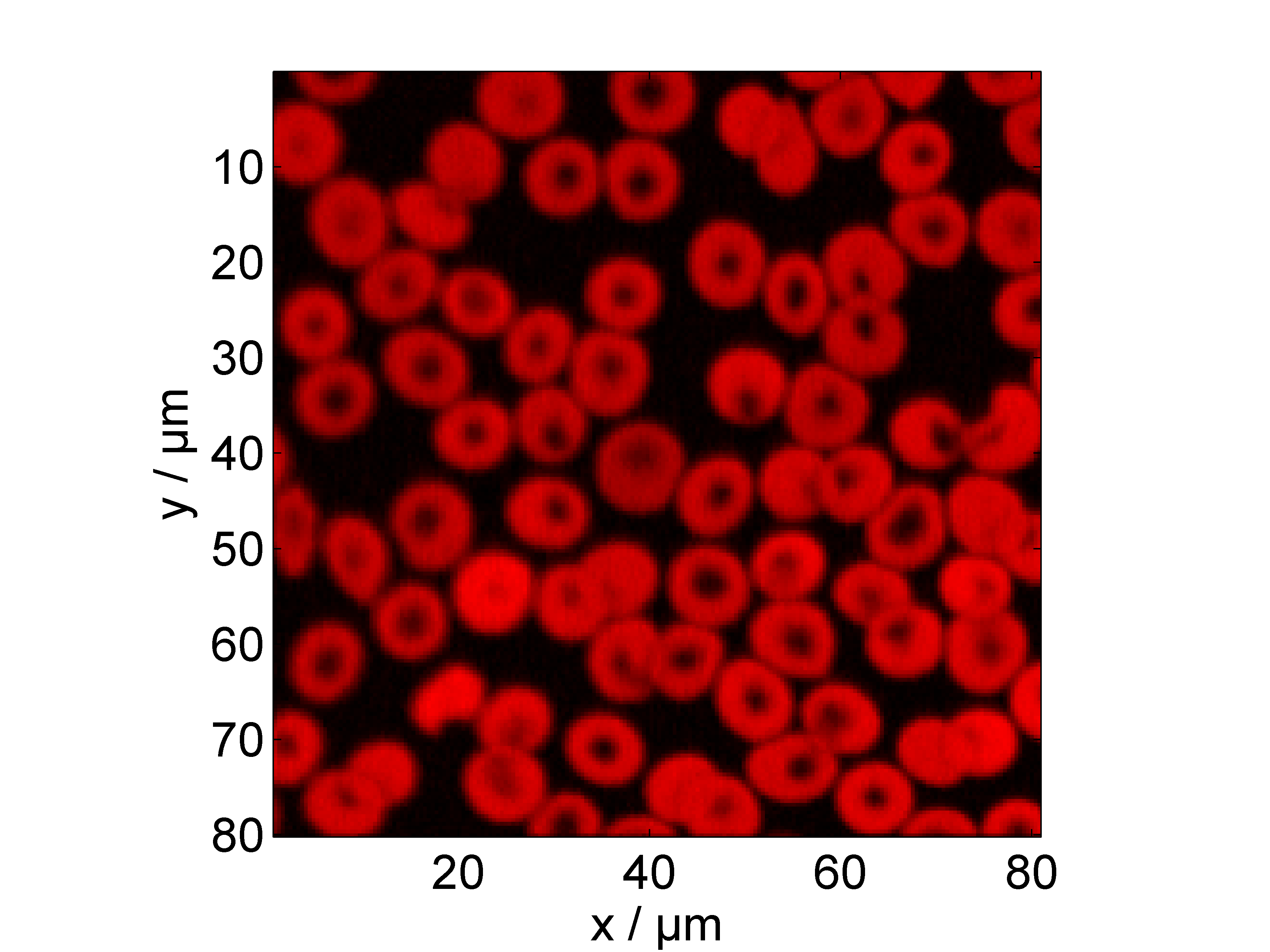
Photoacoustic micrograph of human red blood cells

A microscopy technique relying on the photoacoustic effect, i.e. the generation of (ultra)sound caused by light absorption. A focused and intensity modulated laser beam is raster scanned over a sample. The generated (ultra)sound is detected via an ultrasound transducer. Commonly piezoelectric ultrasound transducers are employed.

The image contrast is related to the sample's absorption coefficient $\alpha$. This is in contrast to bright or dark-field microscopy, where the image contrast is due to transmittance or scattering. In principle, the contrast of fluorescence microscopy is proportional to the sample's absorption too. However, in fluorescence microscopy the fluorescence quantum yield $\eta_{fl}$ needs to be unequal to zero in order that a signal can be detected. In photoacoustic microscopy, however, every absorbing substance gives a photoacoustic signal $PA$ which is proportional to

$PA \propto \alpha * \Gamma *( (1-\eta_{fl})*E_g + (E_{laser} - E_g) )$

Here $\Gamma$ is the Grüneisen coefficient, $E_{laser}$ is the laser's photon energy and $E_g$ is the sample's band gap energy. Therefore, photoacoustic microscopy seems well suited as a complementary technique to fluorescence microscopy, as a high fluorescence quantum yield leads to high fluorescence signals and a low fluorescence quantum yield leads to high photoacoustic signals.

Neglecting non-linear effects, the lateral resolution dx is limited by the Abbe diffraction limit:

$dx =\lambda / (2*NA)$

where $\lambda$ is the wavelength of the excitation laser and NA is the numerical aperture of the objective lens. The Abbe diffraction limit holds if the incoming wave front is parallel. In reality, however, the laser beam profile is Gaussian. Therefore, in order to the calculate the achievable resolution, formulas for truncated Gaussian beams have to be used.

== Amateur microscopy ==
Amateur Microscopy is the investigation and observation of biological and non-biological specimens for recreational purposes. Collectors of minerals, insects, seashells, and plants may use microscopes as tools to uncover features that help them classify their collected items. Other amateurs may be interested in observing the life found in pond water and of other samples. Microscopes may also prove useful for the water quality assessment for people that keep a home aquarium. Photographic documentation and drawing of the microscopic images are additional pleasures. There are competitions for photomicrograph art. Participants of this pastime may use commercially prepared microscopic slides or prepare their own slides.

While microscopy is a central tool in the documentation of biological specimens, it is often insufficient to justify the description of a new species based on microscopic investigations alone. Often genetic and biochemical tests are necessary to confirm the discovery of a new species. A laboratory and access to academic literature is a necessity. There is, however, one advantage that amateurs have above professionals: time to explore their surroundings. Often, advanced amateurs team up with professionals to validate their findings and possibly describe new species.

In the late 1800s, amateur microscopy became a popular hobby in the United States and Europe. Several 'professional amateurs' were being paid for their sampling trips and microscopic explorations by philanthropists, to keep them amused on the Sunday afternoon (e.g., the diatom specialist A. Grunow, being paid by (among others) a Belgian industrialist). Professor John Phin published "Practical Hints on the Selection and Use of the Microscope (Second Edition, 1878)," and was also the editor of the "American Journal of Microscopy."

Examples of amateur microscopy images:

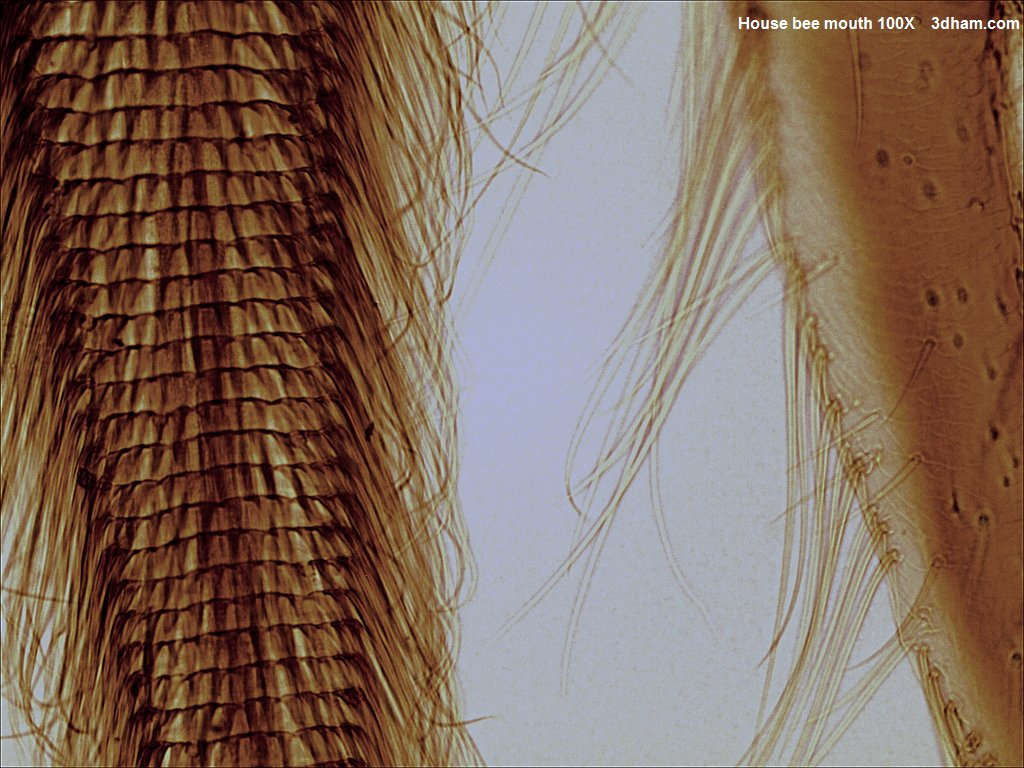
"house bee" Mouth 100X

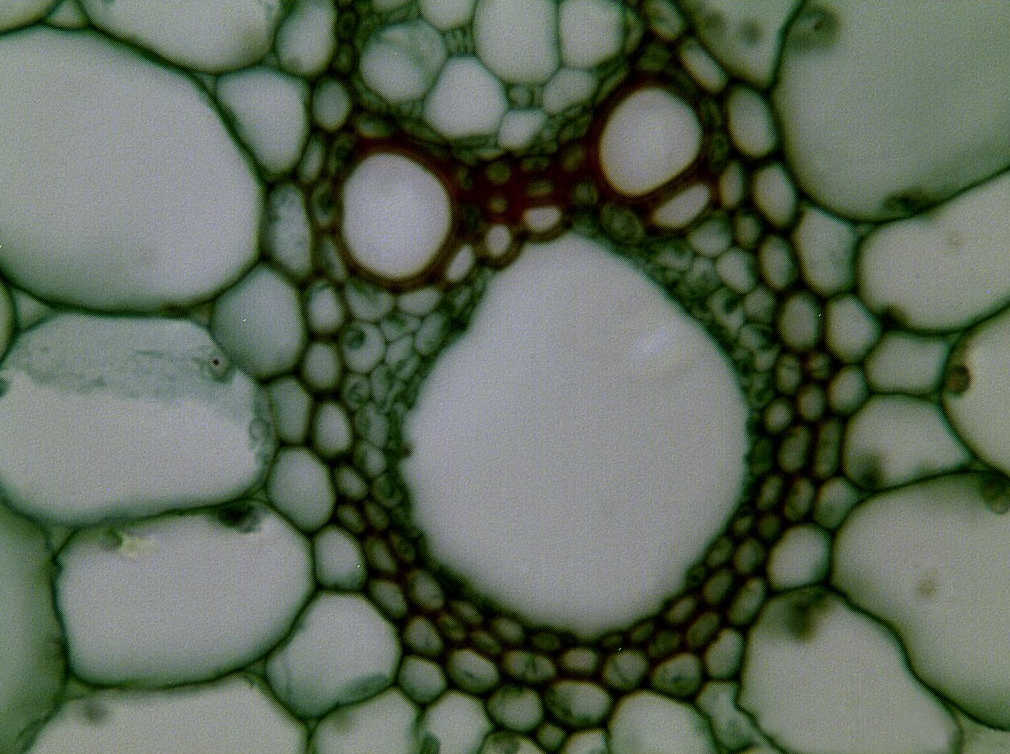
Rice Stem cs 400X

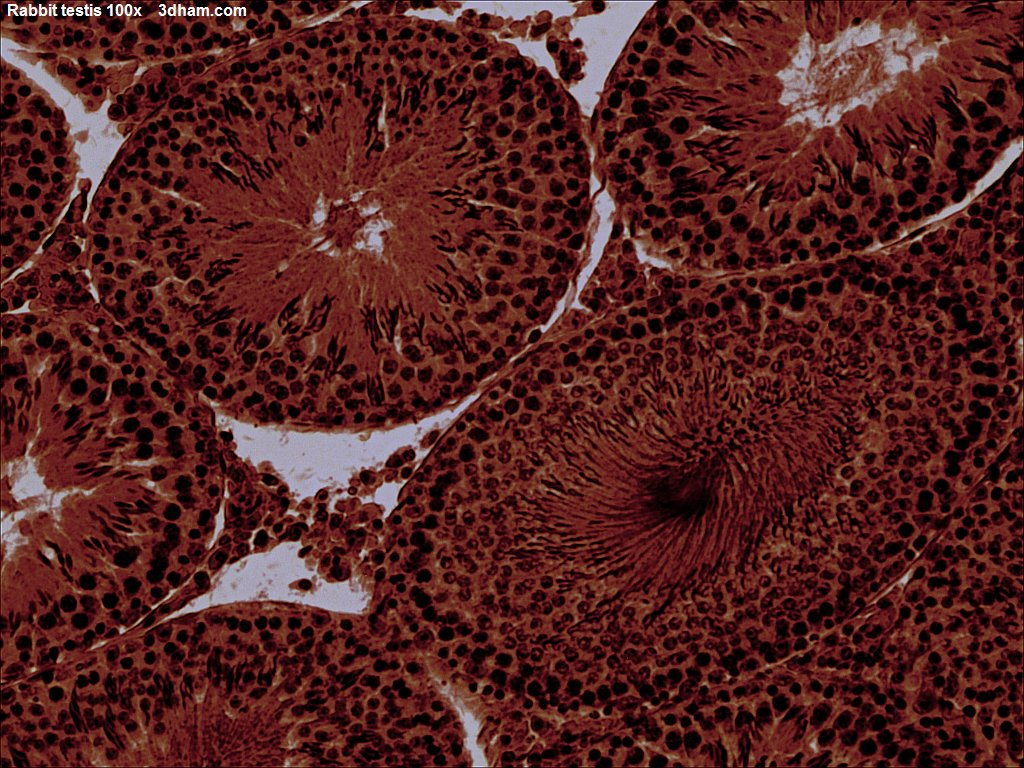
Rabbit Testis 100X

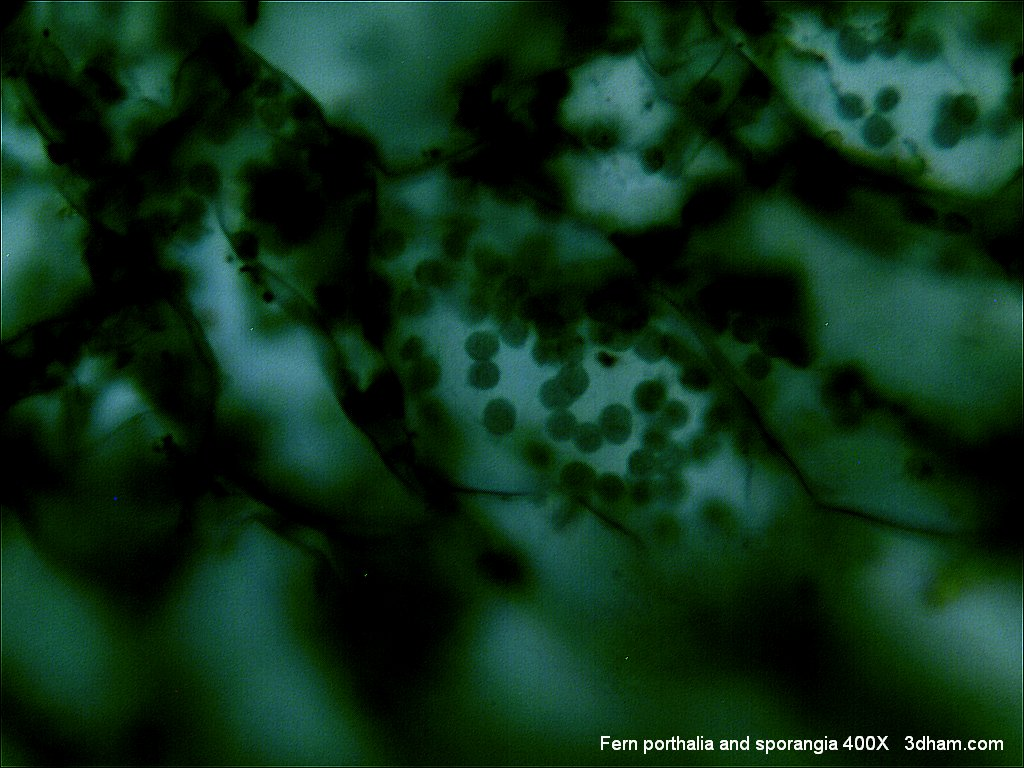
Fern Prothallium 400X

== Application in forensic science ==
Microscopy has applications in the forensic sciences. The microscope can detect, resolve and image the smallest items of evidence, often without any alteration or destruction. The microscope is used to identify and compare fibers, hairs, soils, and dust...etc.

In ink markings, blood stains or bullets, no specimen treatment is required and the evidence shows directly from microscopical examination. For traces of particular matter, the sample preparation must be done before microscopical examination occurs.

Light microscopes are the most use in forensics, using photons to form images, microscopes which are most applicable for examining forensic specimens are as follows:

1. The compound microscope

2. The comparison microscope

3. The stereoscopic microscope

4. The polarizing microscope

5. The micro spectrophotometer

This diversity of the types of microscopes in forensic applications comes mainly from their magnification ranges, which are (1- 1200X), (50 -30,000X) and (500- 250,000X) for the optical microscopy, SEM and TEM respectively.

== See also ==
- List of materials analysis methods
- Digital microscope
- Digital pathology
- Imaging cycler microscopy
- Infinity correction
- Interferometric microscopy
- Köhler illumination
- List of microscopists
- Microdensitometer
- Timeline of microscope technology
- Two-photon excitation microscopy
- USB microscope
- Van Leeuwenhoek's microscopes
- Van Leeuwenhoek's microscopic discovery of microbial life (microorganisms)
