= Elizabeth Harry =

Australian biologist

Elizabeth "Liz" Harry is Professor of Biology and Director of the ithree institute (infection, immunology and innovation) at the University of Technology, Sydney, Australia (UTS).

== Career ==
Harry obtained her PhD in Biochemistry from the University of Sydney before attending Harvard University as a National Institutes of Health Postdoctoral Fellow where she pioneered the development of fluorescence microscopy techniques for bacteria that enabled visualisation of the subcellular proteins inside bacterial cells. and revealed that the proteins within bacterial cells have specific cellular addresses.

She then returned to Australia to be an Australian Research Council Postdoctoral then QEII Fellow at the University of Sydney. She then became Associate Professor at the Institute for the Biotechnology of Infectious Diseases at UTS before being promoted to Professor of Biology in 2010.

== Achievements ==
Harry's research on bacterial cell division has had a significant impact on our understanding of how bacterial cells multiply, and how they control this process to ensure equal partitioning of chromosomes vital for survival. Her research has often changed the direction of thinking in the field, and has afforded excellent opportunities in antibacterial discovery. Her cutting-edge cell biology techniques including super resolution microscopy have provided unique insights in the mechanism and spatiotemporal control of the division process in bacteria. She discovered that the cytokinetic ring, which is a polymer of the tubulin-like protein, FtsZ, forms at the division site at midcell as a result of the remodelling of a cytoskeletal helical assembly of polymers. Her research has shown that this Z ring is linked to the progress of the initiation phase of DNA replication, and gave rise to a new definition for the role of long-known spatial regulators of bacterial division.

More recently Harry has been researching antibacterial discovery and bacterial cell division of bacteria that cause infectious disease, and has worked with industry on the development of novel antibiotics that target this process in pathogens.

== Awards ==
Harry was awarded the 2002 Australian Eureka Prize for Scientific Research, and the 2008 Frank Fenner Award by the Australian Society for Microbiology in recognition of her contributions to Australian research in microbiology. She has had several plenary invitations to international conferences and served on the executive of the Australian Society for Microbiology for several years. She is currently a member of the Australian Academy of Science, National Committee for Biomedical Sciences.

== Selected publications ==
- Blair, S. E.; Cokcetin, N. N.; Harry, E. J.; Carter, D. A. (October 2009). "The unusual antibacterial activity of medical-grade Leptospermum honey: antibacterial spectrum, resistance and transcriptome analysis". European Journal of Clinical Microbiology & Infectious Diseases. 28 (10): 1199–1208. doi:10.1007/s10096-009-0763-z. ISSN 0934-9723. PMID 19513768. S2CID 10947814.
- Lock, Rowena L.; Harry, Elizabeth J. (April 2008). "Cell-division inhibitors: new insights for future antibiotics". Nature Reviews Drug Discovery. 7 (4): 324–338. doi:10.1038/nrd2510. ISSN 1474-1784. PMID 18323848. S2CID 6846383.
- Liu, Sanly; Gunawan, Cindy; Barraud, Nicolas; Rice, Scott A.; Harry, Elizabeth J.; Amal, Rose (6 September 2016). "Understanding, Monitoring, and Controlling Biofilm Growth in Drinking Water Distribution Systems". Environmental Science & Technology. 50 (17): 8954–8976. Bibcode:2016EnST...50.8954L. doi:10.1021/acs.est.6b00835. hdl:10453/49239. ISSN 0013-936X. PMID 27479445.
- Strauss, Michael P.; Liew, Andrew T. F.; Turnbull, Lynne; Whitchurch, Cynthia B.; Monahan, Leigh G.; Harry, Elizabeth J. (11 September 2012). Amos, Linda (ed.). "3D-SIM Super Resolution Microscopy Reveals a Bead-Like Arrangement for FtsZ and the Division Machinery: Implications for Triggering Cytokinesis". PLOS Biology. 10 (9) e1001389. doi:10.1371/journal.pbio.1001389. ISSN 1545-7885. PMC 3439403. PMID 22984350.
- Harry, Elizabeth; Monahan, Leigh; Thompson, Lyndal (1 January 2006), Bacterial Cell Division: The Mechanism and Its Precison, International Review of Cytology, vol. 253, Academic Press, pp. 27–94, doi:10.1016/s0074-7696(06)53002-5, ISBN 978-0-12-373597-3, PMID 17098054
- Carter, Dee A.; Blair, Shona E.; Cokcetin, Nural N.; Bouzo, Daniel; Brooks, Peter; Schothauer, Ralf; Harry, Elizabeth J. (2016). "Therapeutic Manuka Honey: No Longer So Alternative". Frontiers in Microbiology. 7: 569. doi:10.3389/fmicb.2016.00569. ISSN 1664-302X. PMC 4837971. PMID 27148246.
