= Jennifer Waters =

Microscopist

- Education: UNC-Chapel Hill (PhD), University at Albany, SUNY (BSc)
- Known for: Microscopy, Teaching
- Scientific career
- Fields: Microscopy, Cell Biology
- Workplaces: Harvard Medical School, Cold Spring Harbor Laboratory, Wake Forest University
- Academic advisors: Edward D. Salmon
- Website: nic.med.harvard.edu

Jennifer Waters is an American scientist who is a Lecturer on Cell Biology, the Director of the Core for Imaging Technology & Education(CITE; formally the NIC) and the Director of the Cell Biology Microscopy Facility at Harvard Medical School. She is an imaging expert and educator whose efforts to educate life scientists about microscopy and to systemize the education of microscopists in microscopy facilities serve as a blueprint for similar efforts worldwide.

== Education ==
Waters studied Biology at University at Albany, SUNY and graduated with a B.Sc. in 1992. In 1998, she earned her Ph.D. in Biology. During her Ph.D., she used quantitative fluorescence live cell imaging to study the mechanisms and regulation of mitosis in vertebrate tissue culture cells. After completing her thesis, supervised by Edward D. Salmon, she moved to Wake Forest University, where she taught light microscopy courses in their graduate program.

== Career ==
In 2001, she began her position as Director of the Nikon Imaging Center and the Director of the Cell Biology Microscopy Facility at Harvard Medical School. In 2024, the NIC@HMS contract terminated and the core was renamed the Director of the Core for Imaging Technology & Education. Waters and her staff advise and train users in a wide range of light microscopy techniques. Furthermore, she teaches light microscopy courses for graduate students at Harvard Medical School.

Over the years, Waters recognized the need for systematic training of technical imaging experts and implemented such training in the form of a new postdoctoral fellowship that other facilities have started to implement as well, improving technical microscopy expertise worldwide.

Waters has also been involved in several microscopy courses outside of Harvard over the years, including the Analytical and Quantitative Light Microscopy course at the Marine Biological Laboratory in Woods Hole, MA.

Since 2011, Waters has organized an annual two-week course on Quantitative Imaging at Cold Spring Harbor Laboratory in Laurel Hollow, New York. Waters and her team created this course with a dense and comprehensive curriculum. It has become one of the top microscopy courses in the world.

In 2019, Waters was named Chan Zuckerberg Initiative Imaging Scientist. As part of this recognition, Waters has intensified her microscopy outreach activities, including the YouTube channel Microcourses and the searchable database Microlist.

Waters is on the editorial board of BioTechniques, has authored multiple educational articles and reviews on quantitative microscopy, and edited the book “Quantitative Imaging in Cell Biology” with Torsten Wittmann (UCSF).

== Awards and honors ==
- 2019–2024, Chan Zuckerberg Initiative Imaging Scientist Award
- 2021–2022, Chan Zuckerberg Initiative napari Plugin Foundation Award
