= Correlative light-electron microscopy =

Correlative light-electron microscopy (CLEM) is the combination of an optical microscope – usually a fluorescence microscope – with an electron microscope. In an integrated CLEM system, the sample is imaged using an electron beam and an optical light path simultaneously. Traditionally, samples would be imaged using two separate microscopy modalities, potentially at different facilities and using different sample preparation methods. Integrated CLEM is thus considered to be beneficial because the methodology is quicker and easier, and it reduces the chance of changes in the sample during the process of data collection. Overlay of the two images is thus performed automatically as a result of the integration of two microscopes.

This technique is used in order to obtain information at different length scales: the electron microscope provides high-resolution information down to the nano-scale, while the fluorescence microscope highlights the regions of interest. CLEM is used for various disciplines in the life sciences, including neuroscience, tissue research, and protein research.

== Fluorescence microscope ==
In preparation for imaging with a fluorescence microscope, different methods can be used, such as fluorophores or dyes, immunolabeling, and genetically encoded fluorescent proteins. Different fluorescent labels can be used in order to highlight multiple regions of interest in the sample. Recently Kumar et al. combined FRET based molecular tension measurements with cryo-electron microscopy to study how force on talin (a focal adhesion protein which directly links integrins to actin) is related to actin organization. Regions of high talin tension have highly aligned and linear filamentous actin while regions of low tension have less well-aligned actin structure.

== Electron microscope ==
The electron microscope is used to obtain structural information at the nano-scale. Unlike an optical microscope, an electron microscope is able to surpass the diffraction limit of light. This is because the wavelength of accelerated electrons is much shorter than the wavelength of visible light.
