= Excitation filter =

Optical filter in fluorescence microscopy

An excitation filter is a high quality optical-glass filter commonly used in fluorescence microscopy and spectroscopic applications for selection of the excitation wavelength of light from a light source. Most excitation filters select light of relatively short wavelengths from an excitation light source, as only those wavelengths would carry enough energy to cause the object the microscope is examining to fluoresce sufficiently. The excitation filters used may come in two main types — short pass filters and band pass filters. Variations of these filters exist in the form of notch filters or deep blocking filters (commonly employed as emission filters). Other forms of excitation filters include the use of monochromators, wedge prisms coupled with a narrow slit (for selection of the excitation light) and the use of holographic diffraction gratings, etc. [for beam diffraction of white laser light into the required excitation wavelength (selected for by a narrow slit)].

An excitation filter is commonly packaged with an emission filter and a dichroic beam splitter in a cube so that the group is inserted together into the microscope. The dichroic beam splitter controls which wavelengths of light go to their respective filter.
