= Recurrence tracking microscope =

Type of microscope

A recurrence tracking microscope (RTM) is a microscope that is based on the quantum recurrence phenomenon of an atomic wave packet. It is used to investigate the nano-structure on a surface.

== History ==
In 2006, Farhan Saif used quantum recurrence phenomena of wave packet as a probe to study nano-structures on a surface, naming it Recurrence Tracking Microscope (RTM).

== Background ==
The tunneling phenomenon is used as a probe to study nano-structure on a surface with the help of scanning tunneling microscope (STM). The STM is a powerful device for viewing surfaces at the atomic level. The STM can be used not only in an ultra-high vacuum, but also in air and a variety of other media and at temperatures ranging from nearly zero to hundreds of kelvin. This idea was enhanced to create the atomic force microscope (AFM), which is a very high-resolution type of scanning probe microscope with resolution of fractions of a nanometer. The AFM is one of the foremost tools for imaging, measuring and manipulating matter at the nanoscale. The application of RTM includes the visualization and measurement of surface features having sizes and dimensions as small as one nanometer in research and development laboratories as well as a process to control environment.

== Design ==
The RTM consist of a magneto-optic trap (MOT) where super cold atoms are trapped inside; b) a dielectric surface above which the evanescent wave mirror is obtained by the total internal reflection of a monochromatic laser from the dielectric film; and c) a cantilever attached to the dielectric film with its other end above the surface under investigation.

The experimental setup of RTM contains trapped atoms that move towards the atomic mirror under the influence of gravitational force. The mirror is made up of an evanescent wave field, which varies exponentially as a function of distance from the surface. Hence, the atoms experience a bounded motion in the presence of the optical potential and the gravitational potential together. The dynamics of an atom above the atomic mirror is controlled by the effective Hamiltonian,

$H={P^2\over 2m}+mgz+V_0 e^{-kz}\quad (1)$

where $p$ represents the center of mass momentum, $m$ is mass of the atom and $g$ is the constant gravitational acceleration.

The atomic wave packet evolves classically for a short period of time and reappears after a classical period. However, after a few classical periods it spreads all over the available space following wave mechanics and collapses. Due to quantum dynamics it rebuilds itself after a certain period of time. This process is called the quantum revival of the atomic wave packet and the time at which it reappears after its collapse is called quantum revival time. The quantum revival time for the atom in RTM is calculated by finding the wave function for the Hamiltonian, given in Equation 1.

== Static mode ==
In order to investigate a surface having arbitrary structure, the RTM is used in static mode. That is, the atom falls on the static atomic mirror without moving the surface under investigation. Its evolution over the atomic mirror requires a certain position of the cantilever. The atom displays quantum revivals at multiple revival times.

As the surface under study slightly moves, the position of the cantilever changes in the presence of the surface structure. Hence the initial distance between the atomic mirror and the bouncing atom over it changes. This change leads to a creation of initial energy for the atom and thus a different revival time. For each new revival time, the corresponding energy is calculated. This process leads to the knowledge of the structure on the surface and the surface height varies up to one nanometer.

== Comparison ==
RTM advantages over STM and AFM include: a) the surfaces of all kinds of materials ranging from conductors to insulators can be probed; b) surfaces made of impurities can be studied without observing them, as happened in STM; and c) in dynamical operational mode, RTM provide information about a surface with periodic structures in the simplest manner.
