= Gaia Pigino =

Scientist

- Education: University of Siena (Diploma, PhD)
- Awards: EMBO Member (2022)
- Scientific career
- Fields: Cell & Tissue Architecture; Membranes & Transport; Structural Biology & Biophysics
- Workplaces: University of Siena; ETH Zurich; Paul Scherrer Institute, Max Planck Institute of Molecular Cell Biology and Genetics; Human Technopole
- Academic advisors: Fabio Bernini; Claudio Leonzio; Pietro Lupetti; Takashi Ishikawa
- Website: Pigino Lab

Gaia Pigino is Head of Cellular and Molecular Biology Research Center and Leader of the "Pigino Group" at the Human Technopole in Milan, Italy.

== Education ==
Gaia Pigino studied Natural Science at the University of Siena in Italy, finishing with a Diploma in 2002. From 2003 to 2007, she earned her Ph.D., working in the Department of Evolutionary Biology at the University of Siena, supervised by Prof Fabio Bernini and Prof Claudio Leonzio.

== Career and research ==
From 2007 to 2009, Gaia Pigino was employed at the Laboratory of Cryotechniques for Electron Microscopy in the Department of Evolutionary Biology of the University of Siena, under the guidance of Prof. Pietro Lupetti. she continued her postgraduate studies, also attending the prestigious Physiology course at the Marine Biological Laboratory (MBL) in Woods Hole (Massachusetts, USA). Subsequently, Gaia Pigino worked with Prof. Takashi Ishikawa at the ETH Zurich from 2009 to 2011 and then at the Paul Scherrer Institute from 2011 to 2012.

From 2012 to 2021, Gaia Pigino was a Research Group Leader at the Max Planck Institute of Molecular Cell Biology and Genetics in Dresden, Germany.

From 2021 to 2025, Gaia Pigino has been the Associate Head of the Structural Biology Research Center and Leader of the "Pigino Group" at the Human Technopole in Milan, Italy. Her research group operates at the intersection of structural and molecular cell biology, utilizing the most current methodologies from both areas to investigate the structure and dynamics of molecular machines that participate in the assembly and function of motile and primary cilia. Their overarching objective is to comprehend the fundamental molecular mechanisms of ciliary functions, as well as their malfunctions in ciliopathies.

From 2025, Gaia Pigino is Head of Cellular and Molecular Biology Research Center and Leader of the "Pigino Group" at the Human Technopole in Milan, Italy.

Pigino has presented her research at numerous international workshops, seminars, and conferences.

== Awards and honours ==
- 2017 Journal of Cell Science - Cell scientist to watch
- 2018 in annual meeting ASCB | EMBO she was awarded “The Keith R. Porter Fellow Award for Cell Biology 2018”
- 2019 - German Research Foundation (DFG) grant
- 2019–2024 - European Research Council (ERC) Consolidator Grant "CiliaTubulinCode"
- 2022 - Appointed "EMBO Member"
