= Light sheet fluorescence microscopy =

Fluorescence microscopy technique

The principle setup of a light-sheet fluorescence microscope

Light-sheet fluorescence microscopy (LSFM) is a fluorescence microscopy technique with an intermediate-to-high optical resolution, but good optical sectioning capabilities and high speed. In contrast to epifluorescence microscopy only a thin slice (usually a few hundred nanometers to a few micrometers) of the sample is illuminated perpendicularly to the direction of observation. For illumination, a laser light-sheet is used, i.e. a laser beam which is focused only in one direction (e.g. using a cylindrical lens). A second method uses a circular beam scanned in one direction to create the light-sheet. As only the actually observed section is illuminated, this method reduces the photodamage and stress induced on a living sample. Also the good optical sectioning capability reduces the background signal and thus creates images with higher contrast, comparable to confocal microscopy. Because light-sheet fluorescence microscopy scans samples by using a plane of light instead of a point (as in confocal microscopy), it can acquire images at speeds 100 to 1,000 times faster than those offered by point-scanning methods.

Comparison of different microscopy illumination modalities (LSFM: light-sheet fluorescence microscopy, WF: wide-field microscopy, CF: confocal microscopy). Light-sheet fluorescence microscopy combines good z-sectioning (as confocal) and illuminates only the observed plane

This method is used in cell biology and for microscopy of intact, often chemically cleared, organs, embryos, and organisms.

Starting in 1994, light-sheet fluorescence microscopy was developed as orthogonal plane fluorescence optical sectioning microscopy or tomography (OPFOS) mainly for large samples and later as the selective/single plane illumination microscopy (SPIM) also with sub-cellular resolution. This introduced an illumination scheme into fluorescence microscopy, which has already been used successfully for dark-field microscopy under the name ultramicroscopy.

== Setup ==
=== Basic setup ===
Illustration of different light-sheet fluorescence microscope implementations. See text for details. Legend: CAM=camera, TL=tube lens, F=filter, DO=detection objective, S=sample, SC=sample chamber, PO=projection objective, CL=cylindrical lens, SM=scanning mirror

In this type of microscopy, the illumination is done perpendicularly to the direction of observation (see schematic image at the top of the article). The expanded beam of a laser is focused in only one direction by a cylindrical lens, or by a combination of a cylindrical lens and a microscope objective as the latter is available in better optical quality and with higher numerical aperture than the first. This way a thin sheet of light or light-sheet is created in the focal region that can be used to excite fluorescence only in a thin slice (usually a few micrometers thin) of the sample.

The fluorescence light emitted from the light-sheet is then collected perpendicularly with a standard microscope objective and projected onto an imaging sensor (usually a CCD, electron-multiplying CCD or CMOS camera). In order to let enough space for the excitation optics/light-sheet an observation objective with high working distance is used. In most light-sheet fluorescence microscopes the detection objective and sometimes also the excitation objective are fully immersed in the sample buffer, so usually the sample and excitation/detection optics are embedded into a buffer-filled sample chamber, which can also be used to control the environmental conditions (temperature, carbon dioxide level ...) during the measurement. The sample mounting in light-sheet fluorescence microscopy is described below in more detail.

As both the excitation light-sheet and the focal plane of the detection optics have to coincide to form an image, focusing different parts of the sample can not be done by translating the detection objective, but usually the whole sample is translated and rotated instead.

=== Extensions of the basic idea ===
In recent years, several extensions to this scheme have been developed:

- The use of two counter-propagating light-sheets helps to reduce typical selective plane illumination microscopy artifacts, like shadowing (see first z-stack above)
- In addition to counter-propagating light-sheets a setup with detection from two opposing sides has been proposed in 2012. This allows measurement of z- and rotation-stacks for a full 3D reconstruction of the sample more rapidly.
- The light-sheet can also be created by scanning a normal laser focus up and down. This also allows use of self-reconstructing beams (such as bessel beams or Airy beams) for the illumination which improve the penetration of the light-sheet into thick samples, as the negative effect of scattering on the light-sheet is reduced. These self-reconstructing beams can be modified to counteract intensity losses using attenuation-compensation techniques, further increasing the signal collected from within thick samples.
- In oblique plane microscopy (OPM) the detection objective is used to also create the light-sheet: The light-sheet is now emitted from this objective under an angle of about 60°. Additional optics is used to also tilt the focal plane used for detection by the same angle.
- Light-sheet fluorescence microscopy has also been combined with two-photon (2P) excitation, which improves the penetration into thick and scattering samples. Use of 2P excitation in near-infrared wavelengths has been used to replace 1P excitation in blue-visible wavelengths in brain imaging experiments involving response to visual stimuli.
- Selective plane illumination microscopy can also be combined with techniques such as fluorescence correlation spectroscopy, to allow spatially resolved mobility measurements of fluorescing particles (e.g. fluorescent beads, quantum dots or fluorescently labeled proteins) inside living biological samples.
- Also a combination of a selective plane illumination microscope with a gated image intensifier camera has been reported that allowed measuring a map of fluorescence lifetimes (fluorescence lifetime imaging, FLIM).
- Light-sheet fluorescence microscopy was combined with super-resolution microscopy techniques to improve its resolution beyond the Abbe limit. Also a combination of stimulated emission depletion microscopy (STED) and selective plane illumination microscopy has been published, that leads to a reduced light-sheet thickness due to the stimulated emission depletion microscopy effect. See also the section on the power of resolution of light-sheet fluorescence microscopy below.
- Light-sheet fluorescence microscopy was modified to be compatible with all objectives, even coverslip-based, oil-immersion objectives with high numerical aperture to increase native spatial resolution and fluorescence detection efficiency. This technique involves tilting the light-sheet relative to the detection objective at a precise angle to allow the light-sheet to form on the surface of glass coverslips.
- Light-sheet fluorescence microscopy was combined with Adaptive Optics techniques in 2012 to improve the depth of imaging in thick and inhomogenous samples at a depth of 350 um. A Shack Hartmann wavefront sensor was positioned in the detection path and guide stars are used in a close feedback loop. In his thesis, the author discuss the advantage of having Adaptive Optics both in the illumination and detection path of the light-sheet fluorescence microscope to correct aberrations induced by the sample.

=== Sample mounting ===
Different types of sample mounting for light-sheet fluorescence microscopy: embryo embedded in hanging gel cylinder, plant growing in supported gel cylinder, adherent cells on glass, liquid sample in a sample bag

The separation of the illumination and detection beampaths in light-sheet fluorescence microscopy (except in oblique plane microscopy) creates a need for specialized sample mounting methods. To date most light-sheet fluorescence microscopes are built in such a way that the illumination and detection beampath lie in a horizontal plane (see illustrations above), thus the sample is usually hanging from the top into the sample chamber or is resting on a vertical support inside the sample chamber. Several methods have been developed to mount all sorts of samples:

- Fixed (and potentially also cleared) samples can be glued to a simple support or holder and can stay in their fixing solution during imaging.
- Larger living organisms are usually sedated and mounted in a soft gel cylinder that is extruded from a (glass or plastic) capillary hanging from above into the sample chamber.
- Adherent cells can be grown on small glass plates that are hanging in the sample chamber.
- Plants can be grown in clear gels containing a growth medium. The gels are cut away at the position of imaging, so they do not reduce the light-sheet and image quality by scattering and absorption.
- Liquid samples (e.g. for fluorescence correlation spectroscopy) can be mounted in small bags made of thin plastic foil matching the refractive index of the surrounding immersion medium in the sample chamber.

Some light-sheet fluorescence microscopes have been developed where the sample is mounted as in standard microscopy (e.g. cells grow horizontally on the bottom of a petri dish) and the excitation and detection optics are constructed in an upright plane from above. This also allows combining a light-sheet fluorescence microscope with a standard inverted microscope and avoids the requirement for specialized sample mounting procedures.

== Image properties ==
=== Typical imaging modes ===
Most light-sheet fluorescence microscopes are used to produce 3D images of the sample by moving the sample through the image plane. If the sample is larger than the field of view of the image sensor, the sample also has to be shifted laterally. An alternative approach is to move the image plane through the sample to create the image stack.

Long experiments can be carried out, for example with stacks recorded every 10 sec–10 min over the timespan of days. This allows study of changes over time in 3D, or so-called 4D microscopy.

After the image acquisition the different image stacks are registered to form one single 3D dataset. Multiple views of the sample can be collected, either by interchanging the roles of the objectives or by rotating the sample. Having multiple views can yield more information than a single stack; for example occlusion of some parts of the sample may be overcome. Multiple views also improves 3D image resolution by overcoming poor axial resolution as described below.

Some studies also use a selective plane illumination microscope to image only one slice of the sample, but at much higher temporal resolution. This allows e.g. to observe the beating heart of a zebra fish embryo in real-time. Together with fast translation stages for the sample a high-speed 3D particle tracking has been implemented.

=== Power of resolution ===
The lateral resolution of a selective plane illumination microscope is comparable to that of a standard (epi) fluorescence microscope, as it is determined fully by the detection objective and the wavelength of the detected light (see Abbe limit). E.g. for detection in the green spectral region around 525 nm, a resolution of 250–500 nm can be reached. The axial resolution is worse than the lateral (about a factor of 4), but it can be improved by using a thinner light-sheet in which case nearly isotropic resolution is possible. Thinner light-sheets are either thin only in a small region (for Gaussian beams) or else specialized beam profiles such as Bessel beams must be used (besides added complexity, such schemes add side lobes which can be detrimental). Alternatively, isotropic resolution can be achieved by computationally combining 3D image stacks taken from the same sample under different angles. Then the depth-resolution information lacking in one stack is supplied from another stack; for example with two orthogonal stacks the (poor-resolution) axial direction in one stack is a (high-resolution) lateral direction in the other stack.

The lateral resolution of light-sheet fluorescence microscopy can be improved beyond the Abbe limit, by using super-resolution microscopy techniques, e.g. with using the fact, that single fluorophores can be located with much higher spatial precision than the nominal resolution of the used optical system (see stochastic localization microscopy techniques). In Structured Illumination Light-Sheet Microscopy, structured illumination techniques have been applied to further improve the optical sectioning capacity of light-sheet fluorescence microscopy.

=== Stripe artifacts ===
Top: stripe artifacts in light-sheet fluorescence microscopy. Bottom: Reducing stripe artifacts by pivoting.

As the illumination typically penetrates the sample from one side, obstacles lying in the way of the light-sheet can disturb its quality by scattering and/or absorbing the light. This typically leads to dark and bright stripes in the images. If parts of the samples have a significantly higher refractive index (e.g. lipid vesicles in cells), they can also lead to a focussing effect resulting in bright stripes behind these structures. To overcome this artifact, the light-sheets can e.g. be "pivoting". That means that the light-sheet's direction of incidence is changed rapidly (~1 kHz rate) by a few degrees (~10°), so light also hits the regions behind the obstacles. Illumination can also be performed with two (pivoted) light-sheets (see above) to further reduce these artifacts. Alternatively, the Variational Stationary Noise Remover (VSNR) algorithm has been developed and is available as a free Fiji plugin.

== History ==
At the beginning of the 20th century, R. A. Zsigmondy introduced the ultramicroscope as a new illumination scheme into dark-field microscopy. Here sunlight or a white lamp is used to illuminate a precision slit. The slit is then imaged by a condensor lens into the sample to form a light-sheet. Scattering (sub-diffractive) particles can be observed perpendicularly with a microscope. This setup allowed the observation of particles with sizes smaller than the microscope's resolution and led to a Nobel prize for Zsigmondy in 1925.

The first application of this illumination scheme for fluorescence microscopy was published in 1993 by Voie et al. under the name orthogonal-plane fluorescence optical sectioning (OPFOS). for imaging of the internal structure of the cochlea. The resolution at that time was limited to 10 µm laterally and 26 µm longitudinally but at a sample size in the millimeter range. The orthogonal-plane fluorescence optical sectioning microscope used a simple cylindrical lens for illumination. Further development and improvement of the selective plane illumination microscope started in 2004. After this publication by Huisken et al. the technique found wide application and is still adapted to new measurement situations today (see above). Since 2010 a first ultramicroscope with fluorescence excitation and limited resolution and since 2012 a first selective plane illumination microscope are available commercially. A good overview about the development of selective plane illumination microscopy is given in ref. During 2012 also open source projects have started to appear that freely publish complete construction plans for light-sheet fluorescence microscopes and also the required software suites.

== Applications ==
Selective plane illumination microscopy/light-sheet fluorescence microscopy is often used in developmental biology, where it enables long-time (several days) observations of embryonic development (even with full lineage tree reconstruction). In transparent creatures such as the larval zebrafish, light-sheet microscopy can image the activity of the nervous system of a live, behaving animal. Selective plane illumination microscopy can also be combined with techniques, like fluorescence correlation spectroscopy to allow spatially resolved mobility measurements of fluorescing particles (e.g. fluorescent beads, quantum dots or fluorescent proteins) inside living biological samples.

Strongly scattering biological tissue such as brain or kidney has to be chemically fixed and cleared before it can be imaged in a selective plane illumination microscope. Special tissue clearing techniques have been developed for this purpose, e.g. 3DISCO, CUBIC and CLARITY. Depending on the index of refraction of the cleared sample, matching immersion fluids and special long-distance objectives must be used during imaging.

Selective plane illumination microscopy imaging of a live spheroid expressing H2B-HcRed. Z-stacks of 100 slices at slice spacing of 1 μm were recorded every three minutes (10× objective, NA = 0.3). The maximum projection of the z-stacks is shown for each time point.

Images of freely moving DiI-labeled amoebae, obtained using the ezDSLM.

HeLa cells expressing tetramers of the green fluorescent protein. On the left, a transmission illumination image and, on the right-hand side, a light-sheet fluorescence microscopy image is shown. Typical selective plane illumination microscopy artifacts, such as shadows can be seen clearly. The light-sheet was directed bottom to top.

Volumetric reconstruction of the z-stack in the image above.

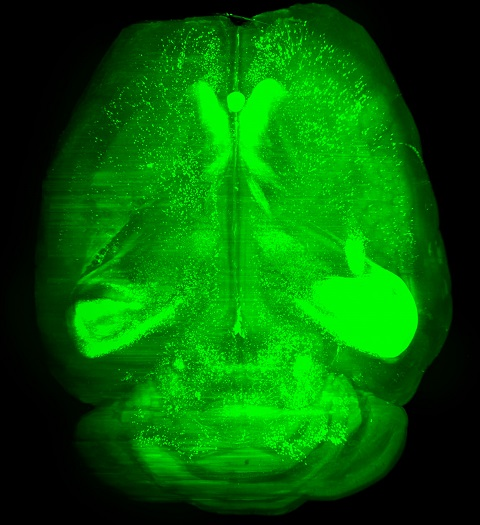
A mouse brain (Thy-1 GFP-M) cleared using 3DISCO method and imaged by light-sheet microscopy.
