= 3DISCO =

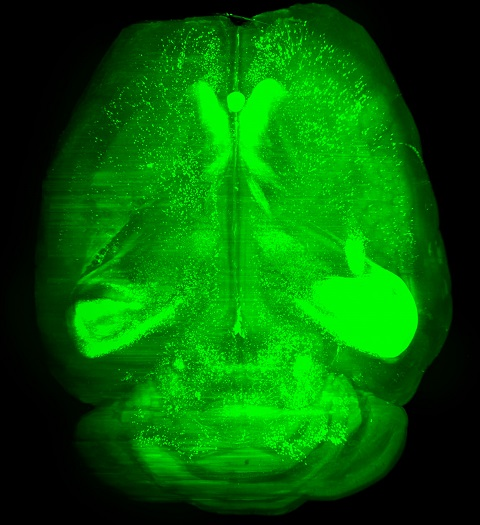

3DISCO (stands for "3D imaging of solvent-cleared organs") is a histological method that make biological samples more transparent (so called "cleared") by using series of organic solvents for matching the refractive index (RI) of the tissues with that of the surrounding medium. Structures in transparent tissues can be examined by fluorescence microscopy, without the need for time-consuming physical sectioning and subsequent reconstruction in silico.

The method was developed by the team of Ali Ertürk and Hans-Ulrich Dodt at the Max-Planck-Institute in Munich, and it was aimed primarily at clearing and imaging unsectioned mouse brain and spinal cord samples. Later on, the original method or modified versions of it were successfully used in many fields of biological research to image and investigate whole body of mice, structure and function within the mouse brain, stem cells, tumor tissues, developmental processes, or whole human embryos.

== History and development of method ==
Use of organic solvents for clearing (making transparent) the tissue was first mentioned more than a century ago by German anatomist Werner Spalteholz. But with some exceptions, (reviewed in) the clearing techniques were mostly forgotten for the entirety of the 20th century. Their renaissance came in second decade of the XXI century, probably due to the spread of advanced techniques in fluorescence microscopy, which allowed for optical sectioning of the specimen (confocal, multiphoton or light sheet microscopy).

For the actual clearing techniques, the first used organic solvent was a mixture of benzyl alcohol and benzyl benzoate (BABB). Authors used this solution to clear mouse brains, mouse embryos, and the whole body of D. melanogaster. The main drawback of this solution is bleaching of GFP signal and insufficient clearing of highly myelinated tissues of adult animals. Therefore, many other reagents were tested, with the aim to find a mixture that was both GFP-compatible and provided better clearing. As such, tetrahydrofuran (THF) and dibenzyl ether (DBE) were chosen as the best regents for clearing. Based on these findings the 3DISCO protocol was published in 2012.

== Procedure ==
3DISCO protocol consists of three steps:

1. initial dehydration performed with tetrahydrofuran (THF)
2. following extraction of lipids via incubation in dichloromethane (DCM)
3. immersion in dibenzyl ether (DBE) for RI matching

=== Principle and protocol ===
The biological samples (tissues) are heterogeneous structures consist of compounds which differ in their refractive indexes. For example, water have RI 1.33, lipids and proteins around 1.40 – 1.45. As result the light is scattered on its path through the tissue, which leads to decrease in resolution or even to disappearance of signal in samples thicker than a few tens of micrometers. Series of steps including dehydration and delipidation of tissue and its subsequent incubation and imaging in medium with RI similar to imaged structures therefore decrease the scattering of light and leads to transparent sample.

After fixation with (usually with paraformaldehyde) and eventually labeling with dyes, the samples are dehydrated via incubation in solutions with growing concentration (50%, 70%, 80% and 100% in water) of tetrahydrofurane (THF). Because its lack of reactive alcohol, aldehyde or ketone groups, THF is less reactive and preserve fluorescence better than other dehydrating solutions. After dehydration the sample is rinsed first in dichlormethane (DCM) and finally in dibenzyl ether (DBE) to match the refractive index of tissue and surrounding medium leading to transparent sample. In DBE samples are stored and imaged as well.

=== Labeling ===
3DISCO protocol is best suited for fixed tissues labeled with strong fluorophores, ideally transgenic models expressing fluorescent proteins such as GFP (alternatively staining with synthetic dyes is possible as well). For antibody labeling the 3DISCO method was optimized and published under name iDISCO (see below Modifications and applications).

=== Benefits and drawbacks ===
Whole process is relatively easy to perform and require just changes of given solutions with no need for some customized laboratory equipment. Process of clearing and subsequent imaging is fast (hours to days depending on sample size), especially in comparison with physical sectioning of whole organ, imaging of their parts and reconstruction before subsequent image analysis (that could easily take several weeks). Above that 3DISCO works on many types of tissues (lung, spleen, lymph nodes, mammary gland, tumors).

Main drawbacks of this method are partial delipidation of tissue during clearing discriminating use of lipophilic dyes, shrinkage of tissue during clearing, partial degradation of fluorescence, complete degradation of fluorescence during long term storage and toxicity of used reagents (and their potential to damage the microscopy objectives if leak from imaging chamber).

== Modifications and applications ==
Note that this chapter illustrates development and use of solvent-based clearing methods and does not provide complete list of applications and modifications of them.

=== Modifications ===
3DISCO method was soon after publication adopted by other researchers and modified with aim to specific goals, like use of retrograde or antibody labeling (iDISCO), clearing whole body of mouse (uDISCO) or clearing of formalin-fixed paraffin-embedded samples (DIPCO).

Authors of iDISCO (stands for "immunolabeling-enabled imaging of solvent-cleared organs") included pretreatment of sample with methanol, hydrogen peroxide, detergents and dimethyl sulfoxide (DMSO) together with antibody labeling before clearing. This preprocess overcome two drawbacks of antibody labeling of large samples. First lowering the autofluorescence of samples and enhance signal-to-noise ratio, and second make tissue more penetrable for antibodies. As result samples as large as mouse embryos or whole mouse organs can be successfully dyed with fluorescent labeled antibodies and thereafter cleared and imaged.

Authors of uDISCO (from "ultimate imaging of solvent-cleared organs") enhance a shrinkage of tissue, a common bystander effect of dehydration of sample in first step of clearing. They used tert-butanol instead of THF for dehydration and also different solution for imaging, which preserve fluorescence better than DBE. Thank to shrinkage of the tissue, they can observe large samples up to size of whole mouse body. It is worth to mention that uDISCO was highlighted by media worldwide including New York Times, Wall Street Journal, Business Insider, Nature and Science magazines. It was also chosen as one of the top 10 scientific images of 2016 by Nature.

DIPCO (from "diagnosing immunolabelled paraffin-embedded cleared organs") is pipeline combine deparaffinization of FFPE embedded tumor specimens, iDISCO clearing and phenotyping of tumor tissue. Tumor FFPE samples are widely stored in biobanks and used for diagnostics, and their 3D analysis could potentially help to improve stratification of cancer patients.

=== Applications ===
Clearing methods, including 3DISCO, was mainly developed for neuroscience research first. The reason is in high morphological and functional complexity of nervous system, which investigation is time-consuming and laborious with classical histology methods. Majority of studies is therefore focused on mouse central nervous system (rodents are one of main model organisms for neurobiology). Authors of 3DISCO method used it first for studying regeneration in the central nervous system (CNS) of mouse, including counting of microglia, astrocytes and mapping trajectories of axons after injury. 3DISCO was also used for mapping the development of mouse CNS. Its modification iDISCO was used for functional studies of brain activity or for mapping amyloid plaques, microglia, vasculature and other properties of brains in Alzheimer diseased patients and mouse models. Modification uDISCO was then used for single cell mapping of neurons in whole unsectioned CNS of mouse.

In recent years the use of "DISCO" methods is broadened to research on many other tissues, including single-cell mapping of transplanted stem cells in whole mouse organs, imaging of whole human embryos in different developmental stages or examination and diagnostics of human tumors tissue.

== See also ==
- CLARITY
- CUBIC
