= Structured illumination light sheet microscopy =

Structured-illumination light sheet microscopy

Structured illumination light sheet microscopy (SI-LSM) is an optical imaging technique used for achieving volumetric imaging with high temporal and spatial resolution in all three dimensions. It combines the ability of light sheet microscopy to maintain spatial resolution throughout relatively thick samples with the higher axial and spatial resolution characteristic of structured illumination microscopy. SI-LSM can achieve lateral resolution below 100 nm in biological samples hundreds of micrometers thick.

SI-LSM is most often used for fluorescent imaging of living biological samples, such as cell cultures. It is particularly useful for longitudinal studies, where high-rate imaging must be performed over long periods of time without damaging the sample. The two methods most used for fluorescent imaging of 3D samples – confocal microscopy and widefield microscopy – both have significant drawbacks for this type of application. In widefield microscopy, both in-focus light from the plane of interest as well as out-of-focus light from the rest of the sample is acquired together, creating the "missing cone problem" which makes high resolution imaging difficult. Although confocal microscopy largely solves this problem by using a pinhole to block unfocused light, this technique also inevitably blocks useful signal, which is particularly detrimental in fluorescent imaging when the signal is already very weak. In addition, both widefield and confocal microscopy illuminate the entirety of the sample throughout imaging, which leads to problems with photobleaching and phototoxicity in some samples. While light-field microscopy alone can address most of these issues, its achieved resolution is still fundamentally limited by the diffraction of light and it is unable to achieve super-resolution.

SI-LSM works by using a patterned rather than uniform light sheet to illuminate a single plane of a volume being imaged. In this way, it maintains the many benefits of light-sheet microscopy while achieving the high resolution of structured illumination microscopy.

== Background and Theory ==
The theory behind SI-LSM is best understood by considering the separate development of structured illumination and light sheet microscopy.

=== Structured Illumination Microscopy ===
Moiré Effect

Structured illumination microscopy (SIM) is a method of super-resolution microscopy which is performed by acquiring multiple images of the same sample under different patterns of illumination, then computationally combining these images to achieve a single reconstruction with up to 2x improvement over the diffraction limited lateral resolution. The theory was first proposed and implemented in a 1995 paper by John M. Guerra in which a silicon grating with 50 nm lines and spaces was resolved with 650 nm wavelength (in air) illumination structured by a transparent replica proximal to said grating. The name "structured illumination microscopy" was coined in 2000 by M.G.L. Gustafsson. SIM takes advantage of the "Moiré Effect", which occurs when two patterns are multiplicatively superimposed. The superimposition causes "Moiré Fringes" to appear, which are coarser than either original pattern but still contain information about the high frequency patterns which would otherwise not be visible.

The theory behind SIM is best understood in the Fourier or frequency domain. In general, imaging systems can only resolve frequencies below the diffraction limit. Thus, in the Fourier domain, all recorded frequencies from the imaged sample would reside within a circle of a fixed radius. Any frequencies outside this limit cannot be resolved. However, the frequency spectrum can be shifted by imaging the sample with patterned illumination. Most often, the pattern is a 1D sinusoidal gradient, such as the pattern used to create the Moiré fringes in the above image. Because the Fourier transform of a sinusoid is a shifted delta function, the transform of this pattern will consist of three delta functions: one at the zero frequency and two corresponding to the positive and negative frequency components of the sinusoid (see below image). When the target is illuminated using this pattern, the target and illumination pattern are multiplicatively superimposed, which means the Fourier transform of the resulting image is the convolution of the individual transforms of the target and the illumination pattern. Convolving any function with a delta function has the effect of shifting the center of the original function to the location of the delta function. Thus, in this situation, the frequency spectrum of the target is shifted and frequencies that were previously too high to resolve now lie within the circle of resolvable frequencies. The result is that for a single image acquisition with SIM, the frequency components from three separate regions in the Fourier domain (corresponding to the center and the positive and negative shifts) are all captured together. Finally, because rotation in the spatial domain results in the same rotation in the Fourier domain, high frequencies over the full 360° can be captured by rotating the illumination pattern. Figure b) in the image below shows which frequency components would be captured by acquiring 4 separate images and rotating the illumination pattern by 45° in between each acquisition.

Once all images have been captured, a single final image can be computationally reconstructed. Using this technique, resolution can be improved up to 2x over the diffraction limit. This 2x limit is imposed because the illumination pattern itself is still diffraction limited.

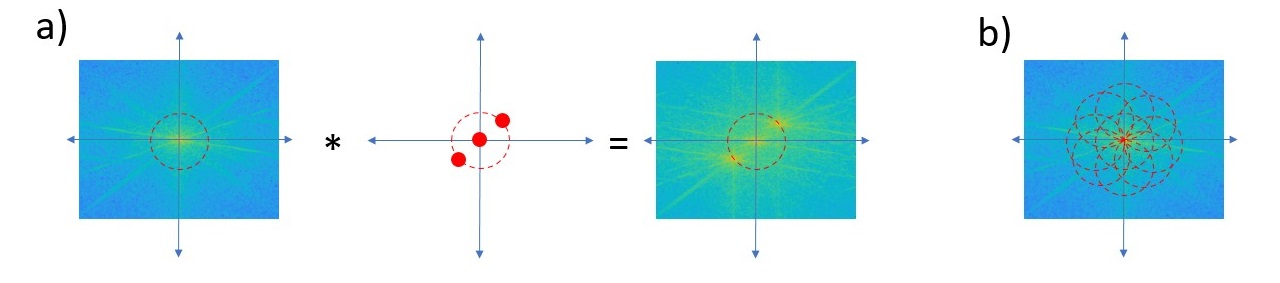
SIM in the Fourier domain. a) Acquisition of single SIM image. The Fourier transform of the imaged sample is convolved with the Fourier transform of a 1D sinusoidal gradient. b) All frequencies obtained after rotating illumination pattern 4 times.

The concepts behind 2D SIM can be expanded to 3D volumetric imaging. By using three mutually coherent beams of excitation light, interference patterns with multiple frequency components can be created in the imaged sample. This ultimately makes it possible to perform 3D reconstructions with up to 2x improved resolution along all three axes. However, due to the strong scattering coefficient of biological tissues, this theoretical resolution can only be achieved in samples thinner than about 10 um. Beyond that, the scattering leads to an excess of background signal which makes accurate reconstruction impossible.

=== Light Sheet Microscopy ===
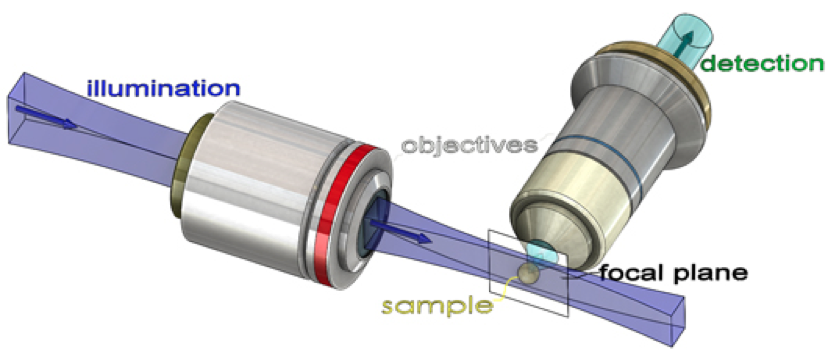
Typical light sheet microscopy setup.

Light sheet microscopy (LSM) was developed to allow for fine optical sectioning of thick biological samples without the need for physical sectioning or clearing, which are both time consuming and detrimental to in-vivo imaging. While most fluorescent imaging techniques use aligned illumination and detection axes, LSM utilizes orthogonal axes. A focused light sheet is used to illuminate the sample from the side, while the fluorescent signal is detected from above. This both eliminates the "cone problem" of widefield microscopy by eliminating out-of-focus contributions from planes not being actively imaged and reduces the impact of photobleaching since the entire sample is not illuminated throughout imaging. In addition, because the sample is illuminated from the side, the focus of the illumination light is not depth-dependent, making volumetric imaging of biological samples far more feasible. A major ongoing challenge in LSM is in shaping the light sheet. In general, there is a tradeoff between the thickness of the light sheet at the optical axis (which largely determines axial resolution) and the field-of-view over which the light sheet maintains adequate thickness. This problem can be partially addressed by the added resolution from SI-LSM.

== Techniques ==
SI-LSM can be divided into two main categories. Optical Sectioning SI-LSM is the most common approach and improves axial resolution by further reducing the impact of un-focused background signal. Super-resolution SI-LSM uses the illumination and reconstruction techniques of 2D SIM to achieve super-resolution in 3D samples.

=== Optical Sectioning SI-LSM ===
Optical sectioning SI-LSM (OS-SI-LSM) was first described in a 1997 paper by M.A. Neil et al. Rather than achieving super-resolution, this technique uses the ideas behind structured illumination to improve axial resolution by removing background haze from layers other than where the illuminating light sheet is most focused. While there are several approaches for achieving this, the most common approach is known as "three-phase" SIM, which will be described here.

It is shown in the Neil paper that the signal acquired by imaging a target with a grid illumination pattern can be represented by the following equation:

  
    
      
        
          I
          
            n
          
        
        =
        
          I
          
            0
          
        
        +
        
          I
          
            c
          
        
        cos
        ⁡
        (
        ϕ
        )
        +
        
          I
          
            s
          
        
        sin
        ⁡
        (
        ϕ
        )
      
    
    {\displaystyle I_{n}=I_{0}+I_{c}\cos(\phi )+I_{s}\sin(\phi )}
  

Here, $I_0$ is the background signal, while $I_c$ and $I_s$ are signals from the region of the target illuminated by the cosine and sine components of the grid. It is also shown that an in-focus image of the plane of interest could be reconstructed using the equation:

  
    
      
        
          I
          
            p
          
        
        =
        (
        
          I
          
            c
          
          
            2
          
        
        +
        
          I
          
            s
          
          
            2
          
        
        
          )
          
            0.5
          
        
      
    
    {\displaystyle I_{p}=(I_{c}^{2}+I_{s}^{2})^{0.5}}
  

This can be achieved by acquiring three separate images under the grid illumination conditions, rotating the grid by 60° between each acquisition. The desired 2D image can then be reconstructed using the equation:

  
    
      
        
          I
          
            p
          
        
        =
        (
        (
        
          I
          
            1
          
        
        −
        
          I
          
            2
          
        
        
          )
          
            2
          
        
        +
        (
        
          I
          
            1
          
        
        −
        
          I
          
            3
          
        
        
          )
          
            2
          
        
        +
        (
        
          I
          
            2
          
        
        −
        
          I
          
            3
          
        
        
          )
          
            2
          
        
        
          )
          
            0.5
          
        
      
    
    {\displaystyle I_{p}=((I_{1}-I_{2})^{2}+(I_{1}-I_{3})^{2}+(I_{2}-I_{3})^{2})^{0.5}}
  

This creates a 2D image containing only information from most focused region of the grid illumination pattern. If this pattern is created using a light sheet, the sheet can then be scanned in the axial direction to generate a full 3D reconstruction of a sample. The primary drawback of using this approach for reducing background signal is that it ultimately relies on subtracting out the shared background signal between two images. Some in-focus signal will inevitably be subtracted alongside the background haze. This will result in an overall reduction of signal, which can be detrimental in low-signal fluorescent imaging. Nevertheless, this technique is the most common use of SI-LSM and has shown improved axial resolution over LSM alone.

=== Super-resolution SI-LSM ===
Super-resolution SI-LSM (SR-SI-LSM) uses the techniques from 2D or 3D SIM while using a light sheet as the illumination source to achieve the spatial resolution of SIM alongside the depth independent imaging and low photobleaching of LSM. In the most common application, a light sheet is used to create a 1D sinusoidal pattern at a single plane of the 3D target sample. The pattern is then rotated multiple times at this single plane to acquire enough images for a high resolution 2D reconstruction. The light is scanned in the axial resolution and the process is repeated until there are enough 2D images for a full 3D reconstruction. In general, this approach demonstrates not only improved resolution but also improved SNR over OS-SI-LSM, because no information is discarded in the reconstruction. In addition, although the theoretical resolution for SR-SI-LSM is slightly lower than 3D SIM, in depths >10 um this technique shows improved performance over 3D SIM due to the depth-independent focusing of illumination light characteristic of LSM.

== Implementation ==
A major challenge in SI-LSM is engineering systems which are physically capable of generating structured patterns in light sheets. The three main approaches for accomplishing this are using interfering light sheets, digital LSM, and spatial light modulators.

With interfering light sheets, two coherent counterpropagating sheets are sent into the sample. The interference pattern between these sheets creates the desired illumination pattern, which can be rotated and scanned using rotating mirrors to deflect the sheets. Additional flexibility can be added by using digital light-sheet microscopy to generate the illumination patterns. In digital LSM, the light sheet is created by rapidly scanning a laser beam through the sample. This allows for fine control over the specific illumination pattern by modulating the intensity of the laser as it scans. This technique has been used to create systems capable of multiple types of light sheet microscopy in addition to SI-LSM. Finally, spatial light modulators can be used to electronically control the light patterns, which has the advantage of allowing for very fine control of and fast switching between patterns.

In addition, much of the recent work around SI-LSM focuses on combining the approach with other techniques for deep imaging in biological tissues. For instance, a 2021 paper demonstrated the use of SI-LSM with NIR-II illumination to improve resolution of transcranial mouse brain imaging by ~1.7x with a penetration depth of ~750 um and almost 16x improvement in the signal to background ratio. Other promising directions include combining SIM with other techniques for shaping the light sheets in LSM, combining SI-LSM with two-photon excitation, or using non-linear fluorescence to further push the resolution limits.
