= DiI =

Names
- IUPAC name (2Z)-2-[(E)-3-(3,3-dimethyl-1-octadecylindol-1-ium-2-yl)prop-2-enylidene]-3,3-dimethyl-1-octadecylindole; perchlorate
- Other names 3H-Indolium, 2-[3-(1,3-dihydro-3,3-di-methyl-1-octadecyl-2H-indol-2-ylidene)-1-propenyl]-3,3-dimethyl-1-octadecyl, perchlorate; 1,1'-dioctadecyl-3,3,3'3'-tetramethylindocarbocyanine perchlorate; D 282; DiI; DiIC18(3)

Identifiers
CAS Number	41085-99-8
3D model (JSmol)	Interactive image
ChemSpider	4646069
PubChem CID	5706735
CompTox Dashboard (EPA)	DTXSID601336591
- InChI: InChI=1S/C59H97N2.ClHO4/c1-7-9-11-13-15-17-19-21-23-25-27-29-31-33-35-41-50-60-54-46-39-37-44-52(54)58(3,4)56(60)48-43-49-57-59(5,6)53-45-38-40-47-55(53)61(57)51-42-36-34-32-30-28-26-24-22-20-18-16-14-12-10-8-2;2-1(3,4)5/h37-40,43-49H,7-36,41-42,50-51H2,1-6H3;(H,2,3,4,5)/q+1;/p-1 Key: JVXZRNYCRFIEGV-UHFFFAOYSA-M; InChI=1/C59H97N2.ClHO4/c1-7-9-11-13-15-17-19-21-23-25-27-29-31-33-35-41-50-60-54-46-39-37-44-52(54)58(3,4)56(60)48-43-49-57-59(5,6)53-45-38-40-47-55(53)61(57)51-42-36-34-32-30-28-26-24-22-20-18-16-14-12-10-8-2;2-1(3,4)5/h37-40,43-49H,7-36,41-42,50-51H2,1-6H3;(H,2,3,4,5)/q+1;/p-1 Key: JVXZRNYCRFIEGV-REWHXWOFAW
- SMILES: CC1(C)C(/C=C/C=C2N(CCCCCCCCCCCCCCCCC)C(C=CC=C3)=C3C\2(C)C)=[N+](CCCCCCCCCCCCCCCCC)C4=C1C=CC=C4.O=Cl(=O)([O-])=O

Properties
Chemical formula	C_{59}H_{97}ClN_{2}O_{4}
Molar mass	933.89 g·mol^{−1}
Melting point	68 °C (154 °F; 341 K) (decomposes)
Solubility	Soluble in ethanol, methanol, DMF, DMSO
- Except where otherwise noted, data are given for materials in their standard state (at 25 °C [77 °F], 100 kPa). Infobox references

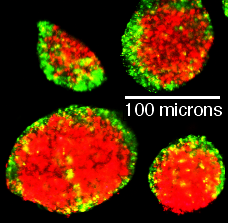
Cultured embryonal carcinoma were stained with either DiI (red) or DiO (green). The image was captured by scanning confocal microscopy.

DiI, pronounced like Dye Aye, also known as DiIC_{18}(3), is a fluorescent lipophilic cationic indocarbocyanine dye and indolium compound, which is usually made as a perchlorate salt. It is used for scientific staining purposes such as single molecule imaging, fate mapping, electrode marking and neuronal tracing (as DiI is retained in the lipid bilayers).

DiI is manufactured by Invitrogen, which has a series of long-chain lipophilic carbocyanine dyes, of which DiI is one of the most well researched members. Some prominent members of the series includes: DiI, also called DiIC_{18}(3); DiO, also called DiOC_{18}(3); DiD, also called DiIC_{18}(5); and DiR, also called DiIC_{18}(7), which exhibit distinct orange, green, red and infrared fluorescence, respectively, and all have the following useful properties, according to the manufacturer:

- Diffuse laterally to stain the entire cell
- Fluoresce weakly in water but highly fluorescent and quite photostable when incorporated into membranes
- Possess very bright signals with high extinction coefficients
- Are well retained in cell membranes
- Demonstrate very little transfer to other cells

== Name and chemical structure ==
The "Di" possibly stands for the di-alkyl nature and the "I" of DiI possibly stands for the "indocarbocyanine" group (which it shares with D383, D384, D3886, D3899, D3911, D7756, D7776, D7777, D12730, N22880). The full chemical name of this major member of the group is 1,1'-dioctadecyl-3,3,3'3'-tetramethylindocarbocyanine perchlorate, the chemical formula is C_{59}H_{97}ClN_{2}O_{4} It has 18-carbon-long straight alkyl hydrocarbon tails on each on the nitrogen (Position 1) of the two indoline rings, a conjugated 3-carbon bridge connecting the 2nd positions (Carbon) on the rings symmetrically, and two methyl groups each on each of the 3rd positions (carbon) of the two rings. The longer names e.g. DiIC_{18}(3) mention the length of the alkyl chain (e.g. 18) and the length of the conjugated bridge between the aromatic rings e.g. 3.

== Derivatives and analogs ==
DiI has several derivatives and analogs in use:

- CM-DiI (C-7000, C-7001) is a fixable analogue of DiI. It has a thiol-reactive chloromethyl (CM) group that makes it more soluble in aqueous solution i.e. culture media and aldehyde-fixable. It has together with SP-DiIC_{18}(3) been demonstrated to be compatible with the tissue clearing method CLARITY, that relies on an extensive lipid removal by detergent (SDS).
- FAST DiI (D-3899 oil, D-7756 solid crystals) has diunsaturated linoleyl (C18:2; Δ9,12) tails in place of the saturated octadecyl tails (C18:0). It reportedly migrates ~50% faster than DiI within membranes.
  - Monounsaturated DiI analog (D-3886, oil) with oleate (C18:1, Δ9) tails is also available. It might also migrate faster than DiI within the membrane.
- 5,5′-Ph2-DiIC18(3) (D-7779) has phenyl substituents attached to the indoline rings of DiI, making it more lipophilic and significantly more fluorescent. It has higher quantum yield and longer-wavelength spectra (red-shifted by ~20 nm).
- Anionic DiI analogs with potentially enhanced solubility in culture media:
  - Sulfonate analogs e.g.: D-7776 or DiIC_{18}(3)-DS
  - Sulfophenyl (SP) analogs e.g.: D-7777 or SP-DiIC_{18}(3)
- Shorter chain DiI analogs:
  - D-383 or DiIC_{12}(3)
  - D-384 or DiIC_{16}(3)
  - DiI and DiO analogs with tails much shorter than 12C, usually less than 7C are used as membrane-potential sensors for mitochondria, based on their vertical sinking into or floating up with respect to a lipid bilayer driven by electric field which changes their fluorescence due to the change in the ambient hydrophobic and charge environment around the fluorescent aromatic rings (they are sensors based on physical movement of whole molecule thus slower compared to membrane potential sensors that work by electron redistribution). Analogs with both intermediate and short tails may be used as organelle stains e.g. of the endoplasmic reticulum.
- Longer wavelength excitable analogs (longer bridges)
  - "DiD" or DiIC_{18}(5) (D-307, D-7757) has a 5 carbon bridge, and long-wavelength visible light–excitable analog with red emission
  - "DiR" or DiIC_{18}(7) (D-12731) has a 7 carbon bridge, with excitation and emission both in the infrared range thus may not be visible without a CCD or other sensing device that can capture optical signal of infrared nature. But they cause comparative less photodamage to tissue. Thus they can be conveniently used for in vivo imaging.

== Physical properties ==
The dye (DiIC_{18}(3)) is a violet crystal that is soluble in ethanol, methanol, dimethylformamide, and dimethylsulfoxide. The crystal form of the dye has melting point of 68 °C (at which it decomposes). The dye had an absorption maximum at 549 nm and an emission maximum 565 nm similar to tetramethyl rhodamine. It is mildly fluorescent in aqueous suspension, but becomes bright when bound to cell membrane. Once bound to a membrane, it diffuses laterally in 2 dimensions; if there is no diffusion barrier, DiI generally stains the whole leaflet (one surface) of a biological membrane rapidly, but does not readily flip across to the other leaflet.

== See also ==
- DiOC6
