= CUBIC =

CUBIC (abbreviation for "clear, unobstructed brain/body imaging cocktails and computational analysis") is a histology method that allows tissues to be transparent (process called "tissue clearing"). As a result, it makes investigation of large biological samples with microscopy easier and faster.

The method was published in 2014 by Etsuo A. Susaki and Hiroki R. Ueda, primarily for use in neurobiology research of brains from model organisms like rodents or small primates. But in upcoming years there were other works published, using CUBIC method on other tissues like lymph nodes or mammary glands. CUBIC can be also combined with CLARITY-based tissue clearing methods.

== Used chemicals and performing of method ==
The opacity of brain tissue is given mainly by light scattering on interfaces between environments with various refractive indexes, mainly between lipids and other tissue compounds. Therefore, partial delipidating and refractive index matching of tissue and surrounding medium is straightforward way to make tissue less opaque and therefore transparent – cleared.

Development of CUBIC pipeline was inspired by previously published clearing protocol named Scale (mixture of glycerol, urea and detergent), because of its simplicity and optimal compatibility with fluorescent proteins. Authors of CUBIC screened 40 chemicals corresponding to those used in Scale with aim to conserve compatibility with fluorescent reporters but achieve better and faster clearing of the tissue. They found that basic amino alcohols are ideally suited for this purpose, probably because amino groups effectively solvate phospholipids and basicity helps to preserve fluorescence signal. Amino alcohols have also beneficial effect when used for clearing of other tissues, which are mostly highly vascularized, and their opacity is given by absorption of light by hemoglobin on top of light scattering. Amino alcohols reduce pigmentation of those tissues very effectively by eluting the hem from hemoglobin.

The original protocol is two-step incubation of fixed tissue in two different aqueous based clearing solutions, altogether taking one to two weeks. First solution, referred as ScaleCUBIC-1, CUBIC-1 or just reagent-1, is composed of N,N,N',N'-tetrakis(2-hydroxypropyl)ethylenediamine (commercially under name Quadrol), urea and Triton X-100 in water. Second solution, referred as ScaleCUBIC-2, CUBIC-2 or just reagent-2, is composed of urea and sucrose in water. This original protocol is slightly modified in different applications, namely in concentrations, incubation times or some components of solutions. The CUBIC protocol can be also combined with perfusion and provide whole organ and whole body clearing of rodents. Besides its use as standalone protocol for clearing, CUBIC-based composition of reagents can be used as refractive index matching solution for CLARITY. This than improve clearing abilities of CLARITY on tissues which stay opaque because of their pigmentation by hemoglobin.

The improvement of CUBIC reagents has progressed and been reported.

== Applications of method ==
The CUBIC method is very powerful, due to amino alcohols and consequent ability to clear almost any organ or even whole body of mice. One disadvantage is incompatibility with lipid dyes, due to high concretion of detergent used during clearing. Despite organic solvents, reagents used in CUBIC are not toxic or aggressive to optics of microscopes, on the other hand the handling with them can be also tricky due to their high viscosity. Also, in comparison with solvent based methods like 3DISCO the CUBIC as method based on simple diffusion is still take slightly longer times for clearing same tissue. Because of high concentration of detergent, the CUBIC ca also partially diminishes the fluorescence or disturb ultrastructure of the tissue.

CUBIC was optimized and used for wide spread of applications and tissues. In the mouse the method was used for mapping the brain activity, analysis of interactions between immune cells in lymph node, description of mammary stem cells behaving or for capturing 3D anatomy of liver, kidneys, lungs and heart. CUBIC was also modified and used for clearing of chicken embryos or marmoset brains. The method was also optimized for clearing and examination of tumors and development of metastases from whole body perspective to single-cell resolution in mouse model. In recent study was also shown few variants of basic CUBIC pipeline, in this case used for diagnostic of human pathologies both on native and formalin fixed paraffin embedded tissues.

== See also ==
- CLARITY
- 3DISCO
- Light sheet fluorescence microscopy
