= Endomicroscopy =

Medical imaging technique

Endomicroscopy is a technique for obtaining histology-like images from inside the human body in real-time, a process known as ‘optical biopsy’. It generally refers to fluorescence confocal microscopy, although multi-photon microscopy and optical coherence tomography have also been adapted for endoscopic use. Commercially available clinical and pre-clinical endomicroscopes can achieve a resolution on the order of a micrometre, have a field-of-view of several hundred μm, and are compatible with fluorophores which are excitable using 488 nm laser light. The main clinical applications are currently in imaging of the tumour margins of the brain and gastro-intestinal tract, particularly for the diagnosis and characterisation of Barrett’s Esophagus, pancreatic cysts and colorectal lesions. A number of pre-clinical and transnational applications have been developed for endomicroscopy as it enables researchers to perform live animal imaging. Major pre-clinical applications are in gastro-intestinal tract, toumour margin detection, uterine complications, ischaemia, live imaging of cartilage and tendon and organoid imaging.

== Principles ==
Conventional, widefield microscopy is generally unsuitable for imaging thick tissue because the images are corrupted by a blurred, out-of-focus background signal. Endomicroscopes achieve optical sectioning (removal of the background intensity) using the confocal principle - each image frame is assembled in a point-by-point fashion by scanning a laser spot rapidly over the tissue. In table-top confocal microscopes the scanning is usually performed using bulky galvanometer or resonant scanning mirrors. Endomicroscopes either have a miniaturised scanning head at the distal tip of the imaging probe, or perform the scanning outside of the patient and use an imaging fibre bundle to transfer the scan pattern to the tissue.

=== Single Fibre Endomicroscopes ===
Single fibre confocal endomicroscopes use the tip of an optical fibre as a spatial filter, enabling miniaturisation of the microscope. 488nm blue laser passes from the source through an optical fibre to a flexible hand-held probe. Optics in the probe focus the laser to a spot in the tissue, exciting fluorescence. Emitted light is captured into the optical fibre and passed through an optical filter to a detector. An image is generated by scanning the focused spot throughout the image plane and compiling the point intensity measurements. The image plane can be translated up and down in the sample, allowing generation of 3D image stacks. Single fibre endomicroscopes have similar resolution of a conventional confocal microscope.

=== Fibre Bundle Endomicroscopes ===
Fibre bundles were originally developed for use in flexible endoscopes. and have since been adapted for use in endomicroscopy. They consist of a large number (up to tens of thousands) of fibre cores inside a single shared cladding, are flexible, and have diameters on the order of a millimetre. In a coherent fibre bundle the relative positions of the cores are maintained along the fibre, meaning that an image projected onto one end of the bundle will be transferred to the other end without scrambling. Therefore, if one end of the bundle is placed at the focus of a table-top confocal microscope, the bundle will act as a flexible extension and allow endoscopic operation. Since only the cores, and not the cladding, transmit light, image processing must be applied to remove the resulting honeycomb-like appearance of the images. Each core essentially acts as an image pixel, and so the spacing between fibre cores limits the resolution. The addition of micro-optics at the distal tip of the bundle allows for magnification and hence higher resolution imaging, but at the cost of reducing the field-of-view.

=== Distal Scanning Endomicroscopes ===
Distal scanning endomicroscopes incorporate a miniature 2D scanning apparatus into the imaging probe. The laser excitation and returning fluorescent emission are sent to and received from the scanning head using an optical fibre. Most experimental devices have either used MEMS scanning mirrors, or direct translation of the fibre using electromagnetic actuation.

=== Non-Confocal Endomicroscopes ===
Widefield endomicroscopes (i.e. non-depth sectioning microscopes) have been developed for select applications, including the imaging of cells ex vivo. Optical coherence tomography and multi-photon microscopy have both been demonstrated endoscopically. Successful implementations have used distal scanning rather than fibre bundles due to problems with dispersion and light loss.

== Commercial Products ==
Four endomicroscope products have been developed: The fluorescence in vivo endomicroscope - FIVE2 (OptiScan Imaging Ltd, Melbourne, Australia) developed for pre-clinical research, the neurosurgical device Convivo (Carl Zeiss Meditech AG, Jena, Germany), the Pentax ISC-1000/EC3870CIK endoscope (Pentax/Hoya, Tokyo, Japan), now withdrawn from some markets, and Cellvizio (Mauna Kea Technologies, Paris, France). The Pentax Medical device was packaged into an endoscope, that used OptiScan's electromagnetic-controlled scanning of a single fibre to perform the confocal scanning at the distal tip of the device. This provides sub-micrometre resolution across a large field of view and up to a million pixels per frame. The original Pentax instrument had variable frame rate up to 1.6 fps and dynamic adjustment of working distance by the user over a depth range from surface to 250 μm.The second generation of OptiScan's scanner has an adjustable frame rate between 0.8fps to 3.5fps, field of view of 475μm and a depth range of surface to 400μm. Mauna Kea’s Cellvizio device has an external laser scanning unit and offers a selection of fibre-bundle based probes with resolution, field of view and working distance optimised for different applications. These probes are compatible with standard endoscope instrument channels, and have a frame rate of 12 Hz.

== Applications ==
The majority of clinical trials have focused on applications in the gastro-intestinal (GI) tract, particularly the detection and characterisation of pre-cancerous lesions. OptiScan's FIVE2 has been certified to ISO 13485:2016 in alignment with 21CFR820 and EU Medical device regulations for installation of the scanner into medical devices while Mauna Kea’s Cellvizio has US Food and Drug Administration (FDA) 510(k) clearance and a European CE Mark for clinical use in the GI and pulmonary tracts. Research studies have suggested a large range of potential applications, including in the urinary tract, head and neck, ovaries, and lungs. Commonly used fluorescent stains include topically applied acriflavine, and intravenously administered fluorescein sodium.
