= Ali Ertürk =

Ali Maximilian Ertürk
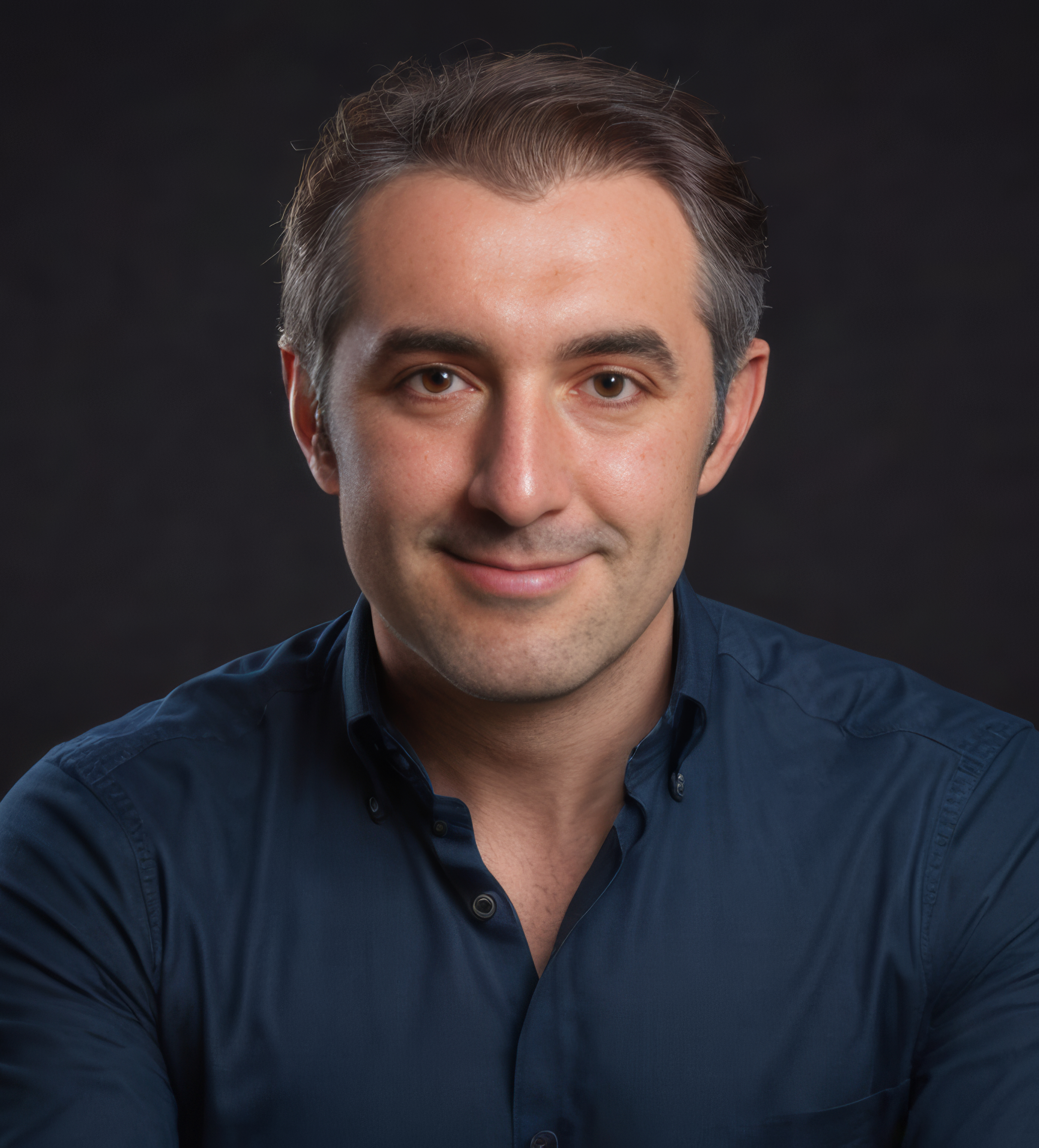
- Education: 2009–2014 Postdoctoral fellow, Genentech Inc 2003–2009 Ph.D., Max Planck Institute for Neurobiology, Munich 1998–2003 Bachelor of Science, Bilkent University, Ankara
- Employer(s): Director, Helmholtz Munich, Intelligent Biotechnologies (iBIO) Full Professor, LMU Munich Adjust Professor, Koç University, School of Medicine
- Known for: AI technologies for development of better diagnostics and therapeutics.

Ali Maximilian Ertürk (born September 1980) is a neuroscientist, inventor, and artist living in Munich, Germany. He is the director of a new Helmholtz Institute of Intelligent Biotechnologies (iBIO) in Munich since July 2019 and professor at the medical faculty. After his undergraduate study at Bilkent University in Ankara, he joined the Max-Planck-Institute for Neurobiology for his PhD and Genentech Inc. for postdoctoral research.

His is known for invention of DISCO tissue transparency technology and deep learning based analysis of large 3D images in biomedicine. The methods collectively target to analyze cellular and molecular details of whole organs and bodies. Ertürk is full (W3) Professor of LMU Munich and affiliated also with the University of Rochester. He founded the AI-driven biotechnology company Deep Piction in 2022 with the aim of creating novel targeted therapies at an accelerated pace to treat life-threatening illnesses such as cancer, Alzheimer's disease, and heart conditions.

== Honors and awards ==
- 1998–2003 Full education scholarship awarded by Bilkent University
- 2004–2007 Marie Curie PhD fellowship
- 2014 Offered Sofja Kovalevskaja Award from Humboldt Foundation
- 2014 ERA-Net Award
- 2016 Member of Helmholtz Alliance ICEMED
- 2016 DFG Research Grant
- 2017 Fritz Thyssen Stiftung Award
- 2018 NIH RO1
- 2019 Mentioned as one of the 7 scientists in "Brain gain instead of brain drain in Germany" by Focus Magazine
- 2019 Cure Alzheimer's Foundation researcher
- 2020 ERC Consolidator Grant, European Research Council
- 2020 Scientific and personal career profiled in Nature Methods
- 2020 Rolf Becker-Preis
- 2020 Research highlighted by Focus Magazine
- 2021 Scientific vision highlighted in Brandeins article
- 2021 Nomis Foundation Human Heart Atlas Award
- 2023 CIFAR Multiscale Human Mapping Awardee
- 2024 Falling Walls Award in Life Sciences

== Entrepreneurial life ==
Ali Ertürk is founder of 2 biotechnology companies called Deep Piction and 1X1 Biotech. Deep Piction is a biotechnology company that combines biomedical research, artificial intelligence, engineering, and drug delivery methods to accelerate the development of new treatments for deadly diseases

One of Deep Piction's primary aims is to develop new methods to deliver drugs directly to correct cellular targets. By using AI to identify specific targets and design drug delivery systems, the company hopes to improve the efficacy and safety of new treatments. Additionally, Deep Piction is committed to reducing the use of animals in research by moving towards in silico models.

1X1 Biotech is another biotechnology company that uses AI to accelerate drug development. The company's mission is to discover and develop new treatments for diseases with high unmet medical needs, such as cancer and rare genetic disorders. 1X1 Biotech's approach combines machine learning, network biology, and high-throughput screening to identify promising drug candidates and optimize their efficacy.

One of 1X1 Biotech's primary aims is to improve the success rates of clinical trials by identifying biomarkers and patient subpopulations that are most likely to respond to a given treatment. By using AI to analyze large amounts of data from clinical trials, the company hopes to improve the precision of drug development and bring new treatments to patients faster.

== Art life ==
Ali Ertürk is also known for his landscape and cityscapes photographs. He had photo art 3 exhibitions (2008 Munich, 2012 San Francisco, 2015 Munich).
