= Mauna Kea Technologies =

Mauna Kea Technologies S.A.
- Type: Public (Société Anonyme)
- Traded as: Euronext Paris: ALMKT; Euronext Growth
- ISIN: FR0010609263
- Industry: Medical Technology
- Founded: 2000
- Headquarters: Paris, France
- Key people: Sacha Loiseau, Ph.D Founder, Chairman of the Board and CEO
- Products: Cellvizio
- Number of employees: 65
- Website: www.maunakeatech.com

Mauna Kea Technologies is a global medical device company focused on endomicroscopy, the field of microscopic imaging during endoscopy procedures. The company researches, develops and markets tools to visualize, detect, and rule out abnormalities including malignant and pre-malignant tumors or lesions in the gastrointestinal and pulmonary tracts.

The company makes Cellvizio, a probe-based Confocal Laser Endomicroscopy (pCLE) system, which provides physicians and researchers with real-time access to histological information during standard endoscopy procedures through high-resolution cellular imaging of internal tissues.

Cellvizio is used in medical applications such as gastrointestinal endoscopy, pulmonology and urology to help physicians diagnose lesions and make accurate treatment decisions in real-time.

Cellvizio went public in July 2011 and trades on the Euronext Paris exchange.

== Cellvizio Technology ==
Cellvizio technology generates cellular images using a small, flexible microscope, providing clinicians with microscopic images of tissue in a minimally-invasive manner. A real-time image processing software combined with a high-speed Laser Scanning Unit (LSU) allows Cellvizio to produce images at 12 frames per second.

Confocal Imaging Cellvizio belongs to a specific category of microscopes, called confocal laser microscopes.

== Timeline ==
History	
2000	Founding of Mauna Kea Technologies
2005	Cellvizio pCLE system receives U.S. Food and Drug Administration (FDA) clearance and CE mark in the European Union
2008	Cellvizio named runner-up in the medical device category of The Wall Street Journal's 2008 Technology Innovation Awards
2010	Cellvizio systems installed in over 180 hospitals and research centers worldwide
2011	Launch of Cellvizio 100 Series; Initial Public Offering
2016	Cellvizio receives FDA clearance for near-infrared surgical miniprobes
2017	Cellvizio receives FDA 510(K) Clearance in the US and CE mark in Europe to be used during robot-assisted surgeries
2017	Cellvizio CLE receives 14th U.S. Food and Drug Administration (FDA) clearance
2018	Cellvizio receives reimbursement clearance in South Korea
2018	Cellvizio technology used to discover new human organ “interstitium”
2018	Cellvizio CLE system received FDA clearance for use in neurosurgery

== Recent discoveries ==
Cellvizio probe-based confocal laser endomicroscopy technology or pCLE was instrumental in discovering the interstitium, a contiguous fluid-filled space existing between a structural barrier, such as a cell wall or the skin, and internal structures, such as organs, including muscles and the circulatory system. It is located in the submucosa that drains fluid into lymph nodes and is supported by collagen bundles. Researchers believe that this organ could be important in a number of pathological conditions including cancer metastasis, tissue edema and fibrosis, and has the potential of being the largest "organ" in the human body. Findings from the study co-led by an NYU Langone Health and Mount Sinai Beth were published in the March 27, 2018 issue of the peer-reviewed journal Scientific Reports
