= DiOC6 =

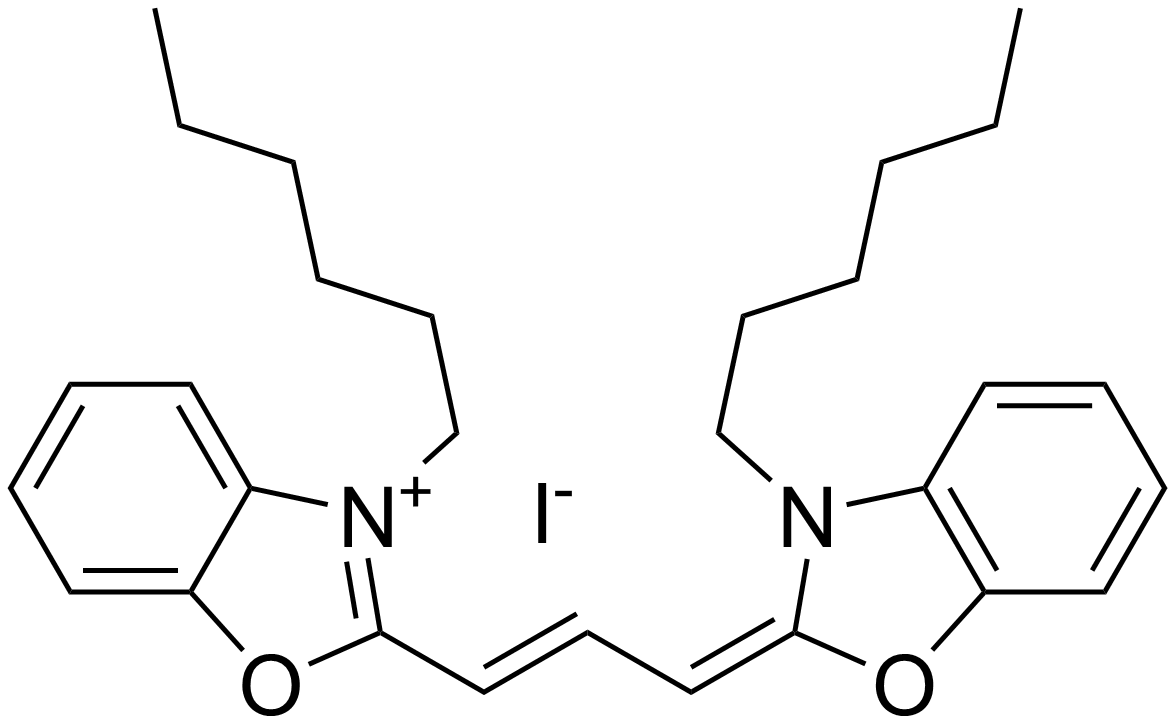

Names
- IUPAC name 3-Hexyl-2-[3-(3-hexyl-2(3H)benzoxazolylidene)-1-propenyl]benzoxazolium iodide
- Other names 3,3′-Dihexyloxacarbocyanine iodide

Identifiers
| CAS Number | 53213-82-4 |
| 3D model (JSmol) | Interactive image |
| ChemSpider | 93680 |
| ECHA InfoCard | 100.155.178 |
| PubChem CID | 9894321 |
| UNII | NL6XJC6U28 |
| CompTox Dashboard (EPA) | DTXSID00886043 |
- InChI: InChI=1S/C29H37N2O2.HI/c1-3-5-7-13-22-30-24-16-9-11-18-26(24)32-28(30)20-15-21-29-31(23-14-8-6-4-2)25-17-10-12-19-27(25)33-29;/h9-12,15-21H,3-8,13-14,22-23H2,1-2H3;1H/q+1;/p-1 Key: XVLXYDXJEKLXHN-UHFFFAOYSA-M; InChI=1/C29H37N2O2.HI/c1-3-5-7-13-22-30-24-16-9-11-18-26(24)32-28(30)20-15-21-29-31(23-14-8-6-4-2)25-17-10-12-19-27(25)33-29;/h9-12,15-21H,3-8,13-14,22-23H2,1-2H3;1H/q+1;/p-1 Key: XVLXYDXJEKLXHN-REWHXWOFAI
- SMILES: [I-].o1c4ccccc4[n+](c1C=CC=C3Oc2ccccc2N3CCCCCC)CCCCCC

Properties
| Chemical formula | C_{29}H_{37}IN_{2}O_{2} |
| Molar mass | 572.531 g·mol^{−1} |
- Except where otherwise noted, data are given for materials in their standard state (at 25 °C [77 °F], 100 kPa). verify (what is ?) Infobox references

DiOC_{6} (3,3′-dihexyloxacarbocyanine iodide) is a fluorescent dye used for the staining of a cell's endoplasmic reticulum, vesicle membranes and mitochondria. Binding to these structures occurs via the dye's hydrophilic groups. DiOC_{6} can be used to label living cells, however they are quickly damaged due to the dye's extreme phototoxicity, so cells stained with this dye can only be exposed to light for short periods of time. When exposed to blue light, the dye fluoresces green.

== See also ==
- DiI
