= Indolium =

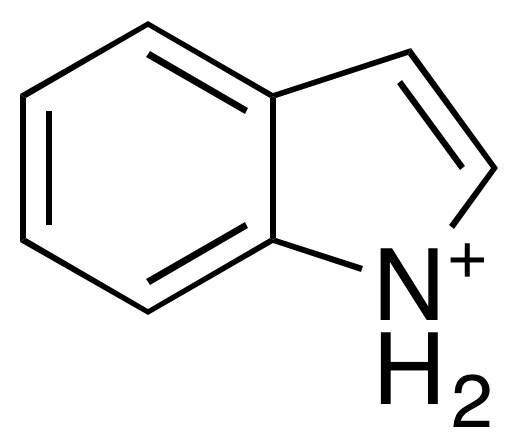

Names
- Preferred IUPAC name 1H-Indol-1-ium

Identifiers
CAS Number	783272-65-1
3D model (JSmol)	Interactive image
ChEBI	CHEBI:52840
ChemSpider	3723290
PubChem CID	4528438
CompTox Dashboard (EPA)	DTXSID601336539
- InChI: InChI=1S/C8H7N/c1-2-4-8-7(3-1)5-6-9-8/h1-6,9H/p+1 Key: SIKJAQJRHWYJAI-UHFFFAOYSA-O
- SMILES: C1=CC=C2C(=C1)C=C[NH2+]2

Properties
Chemical formula	C_{8}H_{8}N^{+1}
Molar mass	118.158 g·mol^{−1}
- Except where otherwise noted, data are given for materials in their standard state (at 25 °C [77 °F], 100 kPa). Infobox references

Indolium is a cation with molecular formula C_{8}H_{8}N^{+}, and forms chemical compounds in combination with anions. It is an onium ion derived from its parent compound, indole, by the addition of a proton.
