= CLARITY =

Method of making biological tissue transparent

CLARITY is a histological method first described in 2013 of making tissue transparent using acrylamide-based hydrogels built from within, and linked to, the tissue, and as defined in the initial paper, represents "transformation of intact biological tissue into a hybrid form in which specific components are replaced with exogenous elements that provide new accessibility or functionality". When accompanied with antibody or gene-based labeling, CLARITY enables highly detailed pictures of the protein and nucleic acid structure of organs, especially the brain. It was developed by Kwanghun Chung and Karl Deisseroth at the Stanford University School of Medicine.

Several studies have applied the CLARITY method to a wide range of tissues and disease states such as immuno-oncology for human breast cancer, Alzheimer's disease human brains, mouse spinal cords, multiple sclerosis animal models, and plants. CLARITY has also been combined with other technologies to develop new microscopy methods including confocal expansion microscopy, SPIM light sheet microscopy, and CLARITY-optimized light sheet microscopy (COLM).

== Procedure ==
A 3-dimensional image taken via the CLARITY technique showing a 1 millimeter slice of mouse hippocampus. The different colors represent proteins stained with fluorescent antibodies. Excitatory neurons are labeled in green, Inhibitory neurons in red, and astrocytes in blue.

The process of applying CLARITY imaging begins with a postmortem tissue sample. Depending on the tissue type pre-processing steps such as demineralization or decolorization may be necessary after sample fixation. Next a series of chemical treatments must be applied to achieve transparency, in which the lipid content of the sample is removed, while almost all of the original proteins and nucleic acids are left in place. The purpose of this is to make the tissue transparent and thus amenable to detailed microscopic investigation of its constituent functional parts (which are predominantly proteins and nucleic acids). To accomplish this, the preexisting protein structure has to be placed in a transparent scaffolding which preserves it, while the lipid components are removed. This 'scaffolding' is made up of hydrogel monomers such as acrylamide. The addition of molecules like formaldehyde, paraformaldehyde, or glutaraldehyde can facilitate attachment of the scaffolding to the proteins and nucleic acids that are to be preserved, and the addition of heat is necessary to establish the actual linkages between the cellular components and the acrylamide.

Once this step is complete, the protein and nucleic acid components of the target tissue's cells are held firmly in place, while the lipid components remain detached. Lipids are then removed over days to weeks for passive diffusion in detergent, or accelerated by electrophoretic methods to only hours to days. Efforts to accelerate by electrophoretic methods remain inconclusive on ability to not cause tissue damage. As they pass through, the detergent's lipophilic properties enable it to pick up and excise any lipids encountered along the way. Lipophilic dyes such as DiI are removed, however there are CLARITY-compatible lipophilic dyes that can be fixed to neighbouring proteins. The large majority of non-lipid molecules, such as proteins and DNA, remain unaffected by this procedure, thanks to the acrylamide gel and chemical properties of the molecules involved.

As reported in the initial paper, the tissue expands during this process, but as needed can be restored to its initial dimensions with a final step of incubation in refractive index matching solution. Tissue expansion does occur in the uniquely lipid-rich brain; however, other tissue types have been noted to not experience as much tissue expansion throughout the process.

By this stage in the process, the sample has been fully prepared for imaging. The contrast for imaging can come from endogenous fluorescent molecules, from nucleic acid (DNA or RNA) labels, or from immunostaining, whereby antibodies that bind specifically to a certain target substance are used. In addition, these antibodies are labeled with Fluorescent tags that are the key to final imaging result. Standard confocal, two-photon, or light-sheet imaging methods are all suitable to then detect the fluorescence emitted down to the scale of protein localization, thus resulting in the final highly detailed and three-dimensional images that CLARITY produces.

After a sample has been immunostained for an image, it is possible to remove the antibodies and re-apply new ones, thus enabling a sample to be imaged multiple times and targeting multiple protein types.

== Applications ==
In terms of brain imaging, the ability for CLARITY imaging to reveal specific structures in such unobstructed detail has led to promising avenues of future applications including local circuit wiring (especially as it relates to the Connectome Project), relationships between neural cells, roles of subcellular structures, better understanding of protein complexes, and imaging of nucleic acids and neurotransmitters. An example of a discovery made through CLARITY imaging is a peculiar 'ladder' pattern where neurons connected back to themselves and their neighbors, which has been observed in animals to be connected to autism-like behaviors.

The CLARITY technique has expanded to several applications beyond the brain. Numerous modifications have been published to build upon the initial publications and efforts have been made both academically and within the biotech industry to apply broad-scope applications to CLARITY. CLARITY continues to gain traction as an emergent technology that can provide powerful insights into clinical diagnostics in the future. CLARITY can be used with little or no modifications to clear most other organs such as liver, pancreas, spleen, testis, and ovaries and other species such as zebrafish. While bone requires a simple decalcification step, similarly, plant tissue requires an enzymatic degradation of the cell wall.

NIH director Francis Collins expressed his hopes for the technology, saying:

"CLARITY is powerful. It will enable researchers to study neurological diseases and disorders, focusing on diseased or damaged structures without losing a global perspective. That's something we've never before been able to do in three dimensions.

== Limitations ==
Although the CLARITY procedure has attained unprecedented levels of protein retention after lipid extraction, the technique still loses an estimated 8% of proteins per instance of detergent electrophoresis. Repeated imaging of a single sample would only amplify this loss, as antibody removal is commonly accomplished via the same detergent process that creates the original sample. However, those calculations appear to lack a consistent method for overall protein loss throughout the experiment. ClearLight Biotechnologies, a company founded by Karl Deisseroth, found that the detergent process originally published for antibody removal was not the ideal approach and have developed a destaining solution that was not as detrimental to the tissue integrity.

Other potential disadvantages of the technique are the length of time it takes to create and image a sample (the immunohistochemical staining alone takes up to six weeks to perform), and the fact that the acrylamide used is highly toxic and carcinogenic. Time has often been cited as a limiting factor and disadvantage to using the CLARITY technique; however, several academic and biotech companies (Logos Bioscience, ClearLight Biotechnologies) have continued to develop and optimize CLARITY reagents that significantly truncated the immunostaining time frame reducing the process from six weeks to as quickly as a week depending on sample type. All tissue clearings have their own safety issues. While acrylamide is considered to be toxic and carcinogenic, its components are similar to those found in gels used for western blots.

== See also ==
- Brainbow
- Diffusion Tensor Imaging
- 3DISCO
