= Optical sectioning =

Imaging of focal planes within a thick sample

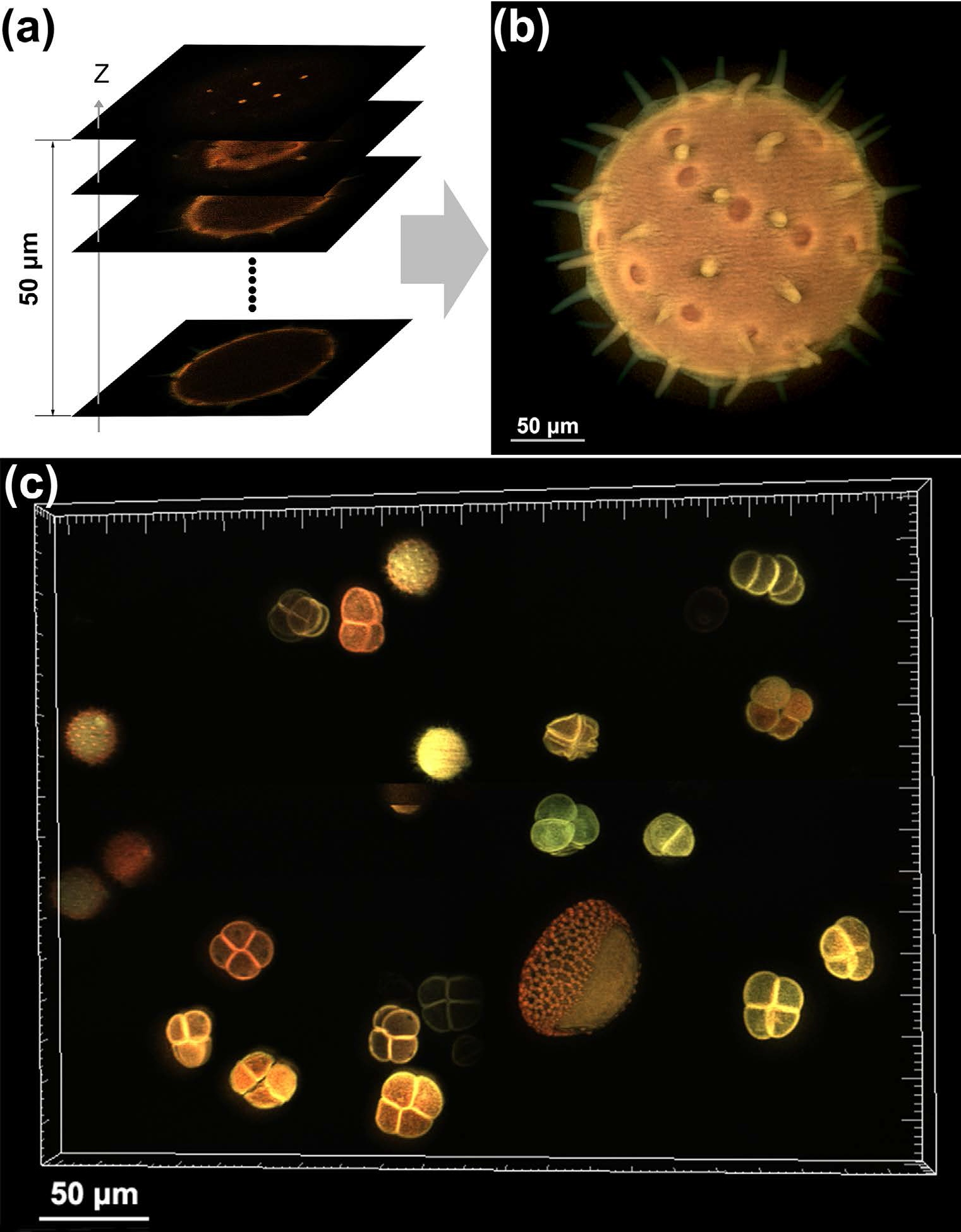
(a) Optically sectioned fluorescence images of a pollen grain. (b) Combined image. (c) Combined image of a group of pollen grains.

Optical sectioning is the process by which a suitably designed microscope can produce clear images of focal planes deep within a thick sample. This is used to reduce the need for thin sectioning using instruments such as the microtome. Many different techniques for optical sectioning are used and several microscopy techniques are specifically designed to improve the quality of optical sectioning.

Good optical sectioning, often referred to as good depth or z resolution, is popular in modern microscopy as it allows the three-dimensional reconstruction of a sample from images captured at different focal planes.

== Optical sectioning in traditional light microscopes ==
In an ideal microscope, only light from the focal plane would be allowed to reach the detector (typically an observer or a CCD) producing a clear image of the plane of the sample the microscope is focused on. Unfortunately a microscope is not this specific and light from sources outside the focal plane also reaches the detector; in a thick sample there may be a significant amount of material, and so spurious signal, between the focal plane and the objective lens.

With no modification to the microscope, i.e. with a simple wide field light microscope, the quality of optical sectioning is governed by the same physics as the depth of field effect in photography. For a high numerical aperture lens, equivalent to a wide aperture, the depth of field is small (shallow focus) and gives good optical sectioning. High magnification objective lenses typically have higher numerical apertures (and so better optical sectioning) than low magnification objectives. Oil immersion objectives typically have even larger numerical apertures so improved optical sectioning.

The resolution in the depth direction (the "z resolution") of a standard wide field microscope depends on the numerical aperture and the wavelength of the light and can be approximated as:

$D_z = \frac {\lambda n} {(\mathrm{NA})^2}$ where λ is the wavelength, n the refractive index of the objective lens immersion media and NA the numerical aperture.

In comparison, the lateral resolution can be approximated as:

$D_x = D_y = \frac {0.61 \lambda} {\mathrm{NA}}$

== Techniques for improving optical sectioning ==
=== Bright-field light microscopy ===
Beyond increasing numerical aperture, there are few techniques available to improve optical sectioning in bright-field light microscopy. Most microscopes with oil immersion objectives are reaching the limits of numerical aperture possible due to refraction limits.

Differential interference contrast (DIC) provides modest improvements to optical sectioning. In DIC the sample is effectively illuminated by two slightly offset light sources which then interfere to produce an image resulting from the phase differences of the two sources. As the offset in the light sources is small the only difference in phase results from the material close to the focal plane.

=== Fluorescence microscopy ===
In fluorescence microscopy objects out of the focal plane only interfere with the image if they are illuminated and fluoresce. This adds an extra way in which optical sectioning can be improved by making illumination specific to only the focal plane.

Confocal microscopy uses a scanning point or points of light to illuminate the sample. In conjunction with a pinhole at a conjugate focal plane this acts to filter out light from sources outside the focal plane to improve optical sectioning.

Lightsheet based fluorescence microscopy illuminates the sample with excitation light under an angle of 90° to the direction of observation, i.e. only the focal plane is illuminated using a laser that is only focused in one direction (lightsheet). This method effectively reduces out-of focus light and may in addition lead to a modest improvement in longitudinal resolution, compared to epi fluorescence microscopy.

Dual and multi-photon excitation techniques take advantage of the fact that fluorophores can be excited not just by a single photon of the correct energy but also by multiple photons, which together provide the correct energy. The additional "concentration"-dependent effect of requiring multiple photons to simultaneously interact with a fluorophore gives stimulation only very close to the focal plane. These techniques are normally used in conjunction with confocal microscopy.

Further improvements in optical sectioning are under active development, these principally work through methods to circumvent the diffraction limit of light. Examples include single photon interferometry through two objective lenses to give extremely accurate depth information about a single fluorophore and three-dimensional structured illumination microscopy.

The optical sectioning of normal wide field microscopes can be improved significantly by deconvolution, an image processing technique to remove blur from the image according to a measured or calculated point spread function.

=== Clearing agents ===
Optical sectioning can be enhanced by the use of clearing agents possessing a high refractive index (>1.4) such as Benzyl-Alcohol/Benzyl Benzoate (BABB) or Benzyl-ether which render specimens transparent and therefore allow for observation of internal structures.

=== Other ===
Optical sectioning is underdeveloped in non-light microscopes.

X-ray and electron microscopes typically have a large depth of field (poor optical sectioning), and thus thin sectioning of samples is still widely used.

Although similar physics guides the focusing process, Scanning probe microscopes and scanning electron microscopes are not typically discussed in the context of optical sectioning as these microscopes only interact with the surface of the sample.

Total internal reflection microscopy is a fluorescent microscopy technique, which intentionally restricts observation to either the top or bottom surfaces of a sample, but with extremely high depth resolution.

3D imaging using a combination of focal sectioning and tilting has been demonstrated theoretically and experimentally in order to provide exceptional 3D resolution over large fields of view.

== Alternatives ==
The primary alternatives to optical sectioning are:

- Thin sectioning of the sample, for example as used in histology.
- Tomography, which is particularly well developed for transmission electron microscopy.
