= History of microscale connectomics =

The term connectomics has two meanings. One is the detailed study of individual connections between neurons of the nervous system, or microscale connectomics. As of 2026 this is only possible on small creatures with at most hundreds of thousands of neurons. The other meaning, macroscale connectomics, is the study of the overall pattern of connections between regions of larger brains, typically humans. This article covers the history related to the first meaning, comprising neural circuit reconstruction, and the analysis of circuits so extracted. Connectomics at these scales searches for mechanistic explanations of how the nervous system operates.

The history of microscale connectomics can be divided into epochs. The pioneering research at was MRC, from the late 1960s to the 1980s, based on electron microscope images and manual annotation. This was extremely labor intensive, and followed by a lull in progress until more automated methods could be brought to bear in early 2000s. This led to a period of rapid progress in methods, results, and model systems, all driven by new software and built on a foundation of different varieties of electron microscopy. Starting in the 2020s, and continuing today, the newer technique of expansion microscopy has the potential to revolutionize the field.

== Origins at MRC ==
From the late 1960s to the early 1980s, the first project to map any nervous system took place at the Medical Research Council (MRC) Laboratory of Molecular Biology in Cambridge. Led by John G. White and Sydney Brenner, this project mapped the connectome of the tiny worm, C. elegans. The worm was picked as it was sufficiently small, development was stereotyped, the genetics were tractible, and it imaged well in electron microscopes.

After early automated attempts failed, as computers of the time were not sufficiently powerful, reconstruction was painstakingly performed by manual annotation of stacks of serial section EM images. This early work has been described in detail. For almost three decades, this small connectome of 302 neurons was the only full connectome available.

== Modern revival ==
For the next two decades, interest in connectomics was scant, due to the extensive labor required. One of the few efforts during this time included the first work on the connectome of Drosophila, comprising one column of the lamina. This effort, completed in 1991, used the existing manual techniques.

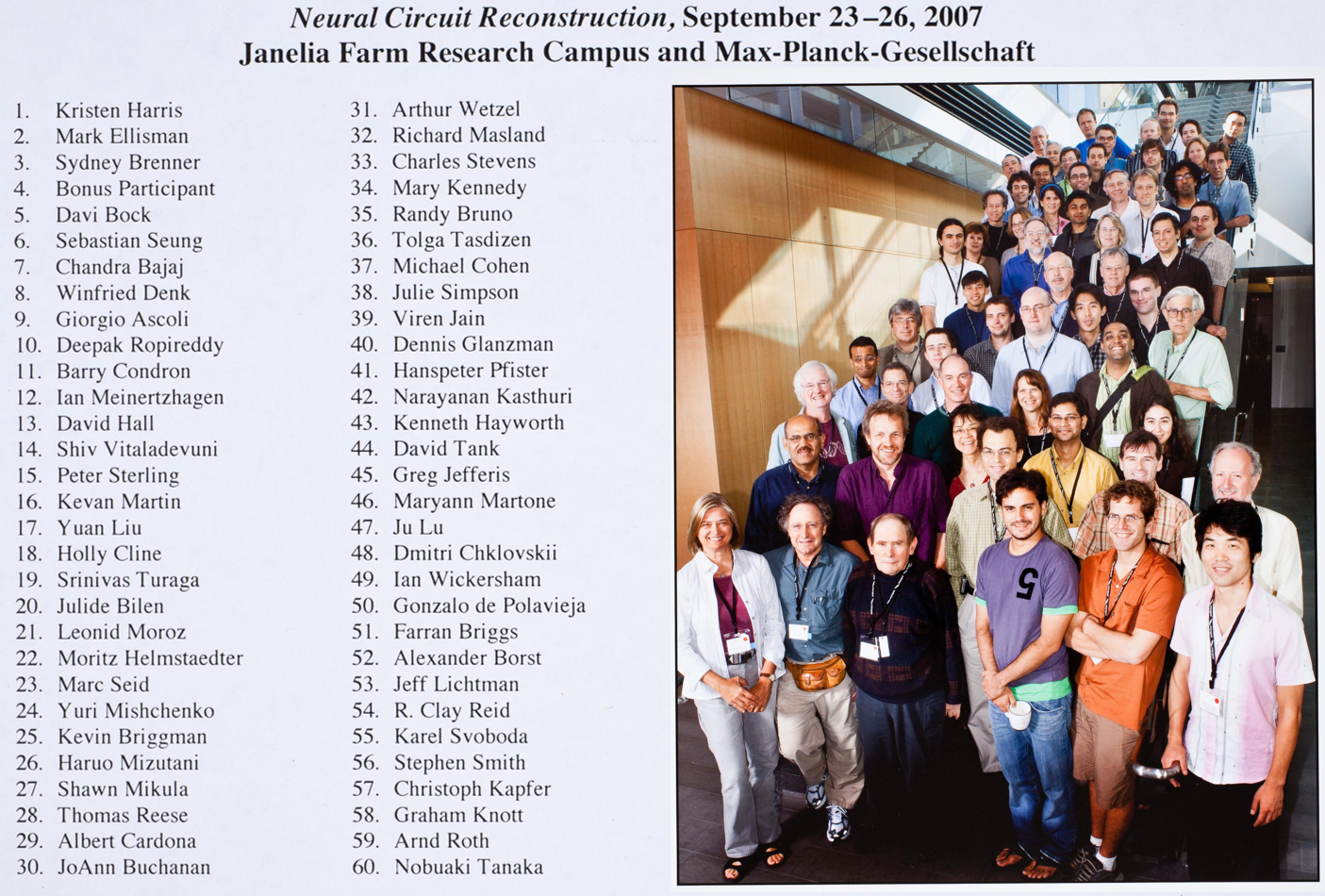
Attendees at one of the first conferences on neural circuit reconstruction

In the early 2000s, interest re-grew, led by Winfried Denk and others.. Computing power had improved enough to make automated reconstruction plausible, the biological interest was there, and the large scale reconstruction of the genome served as example and inspiration. A conference in 2007, organized by Denk, Axel Borst, Kristen Harris, and Dmitri Chklovskii, shows the rapid expansion of the field. Almost all research groups active over the next two decades had representatives attending this conference, and the conference led directly to the DIADEM (Digital Reconstruction of Axonal and Dendritic Morphology) challenge to create algorithmic methods for automated neuronal tracing.

=== Sample preparation ===
Before the sample can be imaged, the sample needs to be prepared. Traditional techniques sufficed when samples were small, but as the scale of connectomics increased, techniques were needed that could uniformly stain larger volumes. Landmarks here included the PLT technique for whole Drosophila brains, and for en-bloc staining for mice brains.

=== Imaging techniques ===
Starting from the early 2000s, the basic imaging techniques for deriving connectomes are:

- Traditional serial section with transmission electron microscopy, and its automated variants. High speed and excellent resolution in XY (typically 4 nm) but low resolution in Z (typically 40 nm), limited by the reliability of cutting and harvesting thin sections.
- Serial Block-Face Scanning Electron Microscopy (SBF-SEM) combines an in vacuum microtome (often called a Denkotome), with scanning electron microscopy. Medium resolution in XY (typically 8 nm) and slicing resolution in Z (typically 40 nm). However, it reduces the problems of distorted or missing sections.
- Serial section to water to wafer, depositing a large number (thousands) of serial sections on a silicon wafer, which can then be scanned by a multibeam scanning electron microscope (SEM).
- Focused ion beam with scanning electron microscopy, or FIBSEM. This gives isotropic imaging (typically 8x8x8 nm) but is typically slower. The speed can be partially made up with multi-beam microscopes.

=== Model systems ===
Different model organisms have been used by different groups, each with advantages and drawbacks.

==== Drosophila larva and adult ====
Drosophila met the main requirements for connectomics in the 2000s. It was chosen for largely the same reasons that prompted the much earlier choice of C. elegans:

- The central nervous system (brain plus ventral nerve cord) contains about 160,000 neurons, small enough to be reconstructed with the (early 2020s) technology of the time.
- The fruit fly exhibits many complex behaviors. Hundreds of different behaviors (feeding, grooming, flying, mating, learning, and so on) have been qualitatively and quantitatively studied over the years.
- The genetics of the fruit fly are well understood, and many (tens of thousands) of genetic variants are available.
- There are many electrophysiological, calcium imaging, and other studies ongoing with Drosophila.

==== Mammalian retina ====
A thin, layered, and repeating structure.

==== Mammal temporal cortex ====
Lots of scientific interest in mammals.

==== Larval zebrafish ====
The zebrafish larva is a sufficiently small, optically transparent organism, which allows neural activity recordings (typically calcium imaging) to be performed in the same animal that will later be used for neural circuit reconstruction. This allows researchers to bypass many of the animal-to-animal variability problems caused when trying to correlate the behavior observed in one animal with the reconstructed circuitry of a different animal.

=== Organizations ===
Major players include Janelia, Max Planck, Harvard, Princeton, Google, the Allen Institute for Brain Science, and Cambridge.

=== Software ===
Manual annotation is too slow to be practical for any but the simplest animals. The largest animal to be annotated by hand was C. elegens, where a 15 year effort yielded a 302 neuron circuit. Introduction of automation, though unsuccessful on C. elegans, was critical in enabling much later and larger reconstructions.

Machine learning has turned out to be a key technology.

- EM image segmentation, introduced around 2010.
- Synapse identification. Different techniques are needed for insect and mammalian synapses.
- Neurotransmitter prediction. This is a challenging problem given the very subtle differences between synapses with different transmitters in monochrome EM images.

A perhaps underappreciated problem is that of aligning a large stack of 2D images into a coherent 3D volume. This is particularly challenging in the case of serial section TEM, where thin and extremely fragile sections can have folds, tears, or stretched areas, and occasionally entire sections are missing.

Another requirement was software specialized for the task of proofreading. Examples include Neutube from Janelia, Neuroglancer from Google CATMAID from Max Planck and Janelia, CAVE from Princeton, Allen Brain and others, and KNOSSOS and WEBKNOSSOS from Max Planck.

A further problem is disseminating the results. Early connectomes could be published in journal articles. Later connectomes could be easily expressed as supplemental data files. Modern connectomes, however, exceed the publication limits of scientific journals and need explicit software tools (mostly web based) to allow access and queries.

=== Major results ===
Although there are many papers and results in the field, those cited here are notable for generating dense connectomes, where every connection to each neuron in the volume is included, to the limit of the technology used. Intermediate results, such as 3D image sets of neural tissue, are not included unless the volume imaged was later densely reconstructed.

Drosophila connectomics began in 1991 with the circuits of the lamina, again with manual techniques.

Progress accelerated starting in the early 2000s. Initial connectomes from the mouse cortex were released in 2011, and the mouse retina in 2013.

Results from Drosophila larva include sections of the brain in 2017, and the full brain in 2023.

For adult Drosophila, a column of the medulla was released in 2013, the alpha lobe of the mushroom body in 2017, half an adult brain in 2020. In 2017, a full adult fly brain (FAFB) volume was imaged, but methods of the time could not cope with its full reconstruction. Newer techniques and the establishment of an online community led to a Drosophila whole brain connectome in 2024. In 2023-2024, connectomes of the male and female ventral nerve cords were released. By 2025, two different groups reconstructed a unified central nervous system (brain plus ventral nerve cord) from a male and a female.

A portion of the primary somatosensory cortex (S1) from a mouse brain was reconstructed in 2019.

A connectome for larval zebrafish was released in 2022.

The first dense connectome from human cortex, layers 2-3 was included in a 2022 human-monkey-mouse comparison. A reconstruction of all layers 1-6 of the human cerebral temporal cortex was released in 2024.

A connectome for the basal ganglia of a songbird was released in 2025.

== Future work ==
A proposed next target is the mouse brain. The mouse brain is roughly 10,000 times larger than the largest brain reconstructed to date, that of Drosophila. As the full brain Drosophila reconstructions each took years of work and cost millions of dollars, it is clear than improved techniques will be required to complete the mouse connectome.

A new model organisms for connectomics is Danionella, a small fish. The Danionella adult is transparent and can therefore participate in combined optical/EM studies. This avoids some problems encountered with larval zebrafish, where the animal is still developing, and hence the connectome can change considerably over the course of an experiment.

The new techniques of expansion microscopy may provide an alternative to EM for circuit reconstruction. In 2024, a new technique called LICONN combined hydrogel expansion and light microscopy to generate neuron level connectomes. Potential advantages include cheaper equipment, faster data acquisition, and multi-color labelling. The equipment is cheaper as a confocal microscope is less costly than an electron microscope. The data acquisition is faster since only a change of focus, not physical sectioning, is required. Multi-color labelling is helpful as some features such as gap junctions or neurotransmitter identities are hard to distinguish with electron microscopy, but are easily labelled by antibodies in optical images. By using antibody–oligonucleotide conjugates, and correspondingly labelled dyes, tens to hundreds of labels are likely feasible. These additional labels have the potential to make the interpretation and analysis of extracted connectomes much easier.

== Timeline ==
Here is an approximate timeline of major advances in connectomics. The selection of events is by necessity somewhat arbitrary, but is intended to indicate milestones in the field. Mammal work not well represented here.

- 1969: First reconstruction work begins as J.G. White joins MRC
- 1986: Publication of C. elegans connectome.
- 1991: First Drosophila work, a column of the lamina.
- 2000s: Interest begins to ramp back up.
- 2007: A conference of neural circuit reconstruction includes many actors of next two decades of this work.
- 2010: Neural networks start being used for connectomic tasks, starting with image segmentation.
- 2011: Initial mouse visual cortex and rabbit retina connectomes released.
- 2013: Mouse retina and medulla column of adult Drosophila released.
- 2014: Automated synapse detection.
- 2017: Full adult Drosophila brain imaged and released (but without connectome). Larval Drosophila mushroom body released.
- 2020: Hemibrain connectome of adult Drosophila released.
- 2022: Larval zebrafish connectome released.
- 2023: Full larval Drosophila connectome released.
- 2024: Full adult Drosophila brain connectome released; first light-based (LICONN) results; neurotransmitters estimated from EM.
- 2025: Full adult Drosophila nervous system (combined brain and nerve cord) released for male and female.

== See also ==
- Connectome
- Connectomics
- Neural circuit reconstruction
- Drosophila connectome
- Another history from Simons Institute in 2021.
