= Drosophila connectome =

Connection graph of the brain of the fruit fly Drosophila melanogaster

A Drosophila connectome is a list of neurons in the Drosophila melanogaster (fruit fly) nervous system, and the chemical synapses between them. The fly's central nervous system consists of the brain plus the ventral nerve cord, and both are known to differ considerably between male and female. Complete or partial connectomes exist for the female adult brain, the male and female adult nerve cords, the male and female adult central nervous system (connected brain and nerve cord), and the female larval central nervous system. The available connectomes show only chemical synapses - other forms of inter-neuron communication such as gap junctions or neuromodulators are not represented. Drosophila melanogaster has a far larger and more complex nervous system than the other organisms for which complete connectomes exist (the nematode C. elegans, the sea squirt Ciona intestinalis, and the annelid Platynereis dumerilii). The neural circuit reconstruction methods for producing these datasets have developed over the course of many years, working up through various subsets of the nervous system for both male and female flies.

== Why Drosophila ==
Connectome research (connectomics) has a number of competing objectives. On the one hand, investigators prefer an organism small enough that the connectome can be obtained in a reasonable amount of time. This argues for a small creature. On the other hand, one of the main uses of a connectome is to relate structure and behavior, so an animal with a large behavioral repertoire is desirable. It's also very helpful to use an animal with a large existing community of experimentalists, and many available genetic tools. Drosophila meets all of these requirements:

- The central nervous system (brain plus ventral nerve cord) contains about 160,000 neurons, small enough to be reconstructed with existing technology.
- The fruit fly exhibits many complex behaviors. Hundreds of different behaviors (feeding, grooming, flying, mating, learning, and so on) have been qualitatively and quantitatively studied over the years.
- The genetics of the fruit fly are well understood, and many (tens of thousands) of genetic variants are available.
- There are many electrophysiological, calcium imaging, and other studies ongoing with Drosophila.

== Structure of the fly connectome ==
Synapses in the Drosophila are polyadic, meaning they have multiple postsynaptic elements (commonly called PSDs, for postsynaptic densities) opposed to one presynaptic element (commonly called a T-bar, due to its most common appearance). Synapse counts can be reported either way - as number of structures, or number of partners. Cell and synapse counts are known to vary between individuals.

For the larva, there is one full female connectome available. For adults, full connectomes of the female brain (~120,000 neurons, ~30,000,000 synapses) and both the male and female ventral nerve cord (VNC, the fly's equivalent of the spinal cord, ~14,600 neurons) are also available. In 2025, two teams reported complete adult CNS connectomes that include both the brain and the VNC, in male and female flies respectively.

=== Adult brain ===
Drosophila connectomics started in 1991 with a description of the circuits of the lamina. However the methods used were largely manual and further progress awaited more automated techniques.

In 2011, a high-level connectome, at the level of brain compartments and interconnecting tracts of neurons, for the full fly brain was published, and is available online. New techniques such as digital image processing began to be applied to detailed neural reconstruction.

Reconstructions of larger regions soon followed, including a column of the medulla, also in the visual system of the fruit fly, and the alpha lobe of the mushroom body.

In 2020, a dense connectome of half the central brain of Drosophila was released, along with a web site that allows queries and exploration of this data. The methods used in reconstruction and initial analysis of the 'hemibrain' connectome followed. This effort was a collaboration between the Janelia FlyEM team and Google. This dataset is an incomplete but large section of the fly central brain. It was collected using focused ion beam scanning electron microscopy (FIB-SEM) which generated an 8 nm isotropic dataset, then automatically segmented using a flood-filling network before being manually proofread by a team of experts. Finally, estimated neurotransmitter IDs were added.

In 2017, a full adult fly brain (FAFB) volume was imaged by a team at Janelia Research Campus using a novel high-throughput serial section transmission electron microscopy (ssTEM) pipeline. At the time, however, automated methods could not cope with its reconstruction, but the volume was available for sparse tracing of selected circuits. Six years later, in 2023, Sebastian Seung's lab at Princeton used convolutional neural networks (CNNs) to automatically segment neurons, while Jan Funke's lab at Janelia used similar techniques to detect pre- and postsynaptic sites. This automated version was then used as a starting point for a massive community effort among fly neuroscientists to proofread neuronal morphologies by correcting errors and adding information about cell type and other attributes. This effort, called FlyWire, was conducted by Sebastian Seung and Mala Murthy of the Princeton Neuroscience Institute in conjunction with a large team of other scientists and labs called the FlyWire Consortium. The full brain connectome produced by this effort is now publicly available and searchable through the FlyWire Codex. This full brain connectome (of a female) contains roughly 5x10^7 chemical synapses between ~130,000 neurons. Estimated neurotransmitter IDs were added, again using techniques from the Funke lab. A projectome, a map of projections between regions, can be derived from the connectome. In 2025 a new set of synapses, with much better recall but somewhat worse precision was released.

Members of the fly connectomics community have made an effort to match cell types between FlyWire and the Hemibrain. They have found that at first pass, 61% of Hemibrain types are found in the FlyWire dataset and, out of these consensus cell types, 53% of "edges" from one cell type to another can be found in both datasets (but edges connected by at least 10 synapses are much more consistently found across datasets). In parallel, a consensus cell type atlas for the Drosophila brain was published, produced based on this 'FlyWire' connectome and the prior 'hemibrain'. This resource includes 4,552 cell types: 3,094 as rigorous validations of those previously proposed in the hemibrain connectome; 1,458 new cell types, arising mostly from the fact that the FlyWire connectome spans the whole brain, whereas the hemibrain derives from a subvolume. Comparison of these distinct, adult Drosophila connectomes showed that cell type counts and strong connections were largely stable, but connection weights were surprisingly variable within and across animals.

=== Adult ventral nerve cord ===
There are two publicly available datasets of the adult fly ventral nerve cord (VNC). The female adult nerve cord (FANC) was collected using high-throughput ssTEM by Wei-Chung Allen Lee's lab at Harvard Medical School. It then underwent automatic segmentation and synapse prediction using CNNs, and researchers at Harvard and the University of Washington mapped motor neurons with cell bodies in the VNC to their muscular targets by cross-referencing between the EM dataset, a high-resolution nanotomography image volume of the fly leg, and sparse genetic lines to label individual neurons with fluorescent proteins. FANC was further reconstructed in 2024.

The male adult nerve cord (MANC) was collected and segmented at Janelia using FIB-SEM and flood-filling network protocols modified from the Hemibrain pipeline. In a collaboration between researchers at Janelia, Google, the University of Cambridge, and the MRC Laboratory of Molecular Biology (LMB), it is fully proofread and annotated with cell types and other properties (in particular predicted neurotransmitter identities), and searchable on neuPrint.

=== Adult central nervous system ===
Two different groups have reconstructed a unified central nervous system (brain plus ventral nerve cord) of an adult Drosophila melanogaster. The Brain and Nerve Cord (BANC) dataset is from a female, and the Male CNS from a male.

BANC was imaged using high-throughput ssTEM and processed using automated image alignment, cell segmentation, and synapse detection with convolutional neural networks. This automated processing was followed by ongoing manual proofreading. Reconstructed cells have been annotated with their cell type and other properties, which was accomplished in part by computationally matching the morphology and connectivity of each neuron in the BANC against neurons in existing connectome datasets. The BANC dataset, which contains approximately 160K neurons and 214M synapses, is searchable through the FlyWire Codex, where it is integrated with the FAFB and MANC datasets such that you can cross-reference identical cells in these datasets using shared nomenclature. The collection, processing, and analysis of this dataset was led by teams of scientists at Harvard Medical School and the Princeton Neuroscience Institute, with the participation of many other labs and individuals across the globe, as well as concentrated proofreading efforts by designated teams at Princeton, SixEleven, and Aelysia.

The Male CNS was imaged using FIB-SEM and scanning electron microscopy, and similarly processed with a combination of automated and manual efforts. The resulting connectome of 166K neurons and 312M synapses is available and searchable on-line. The main focus of the initial analysis is sexual dimorphism, or the differences between the brains of males and females. The collection, processing, and analysis was led by teams of scientists at the Janelia Research Campus, the University of Cambridge, the MRC Laboratory of Molecular Biology (LMB), and Google.

=== Larval central nervous system ===
The connectome of a complete central nervous system (connected brain and VNC) of a 1st instar D. melanogaster larva has been reconstructed as a single dataset of 3016 neurons. The imaging was done at Janelia using serial section electron microscopy. This dataset was segmented and annotated manually using CATMAID by a team of people mainly led by researchers at Janelia, Cambridge, and the MRC LMB. They found that the larval brain was composed of 3,016 neurons and 548,000 synapses. 93% of brain neurons had a homolog in the opposite hemisphere. Of the synapses, 66.6% were axo-dendritic, 25.8% were axo-axonic, 5.8% were dendro-dendritic, and 1.8% were dendro-axonic.

To study the connectome, they treated it as a directed graph with the neurons forming nodes and the synapses forming the edges. Using this representation, Winding et al found that the larval brain neurons could be clustered into 93 different types, based on connectivity alone. These types aligned with the known neural groups including sensory neurons (visual, olfactory, gustatory, thermal, etc), descending neurons, and ascending neurons.

The authors ordered these neuron types based on proximity to brain inputs vs brain outputs. Using this ordering, they could quantify the proportion of recurrent connections, as the set of connections going from neurons closer to outputs towards inputs. They found that 41% of all brain neurons formed a recurrent connection. The neuron types with the most recurrent connections were the dopaminergic neurons (57%), mushroom body feedback neurons (51%), mushroom body output neurons (45%), and convergence neurons (42%) (receiving input from mushroom body and lateral horn regions). These neurons, implicated in learning, memory, and action-selection, form a set of recurrent loops.

== Structure and behavior ==
One of the main uses of the Drosophila connectome is to understand the neural circuits and other brain structures that give rise to behavior. This area is under very active investigation. For example, the fruit fly connectome has been used to identify an area of the fruit fly brain that is involved in odor detection and tracking. Flies choose a direction in turbulent conditions by combining information about the direction of air flow and the movement of odor packets. Based on the fly connectome, processing must occur in the "fan-shaped body" where wind-sensing neurons and olfactory direction-sensing neurons cross.

A natural question is whether the connectome will allow simulation of the fly's behavior. However, the connectome alone is not sufficient. A comprehensive simulation would need to include gap junction varieties and locations, identities of neurotransmitters, receptor types and locations, neuromodulators and hormones (with sources and receptors), the role of glial cells, time evolution rules for synapses, and more. However, some pathways have been simulated using only the connectome plus neurotransmitter predictions.

== See also ==
- Virtual Fly Brain
- Pigment dispersing factor
- Ganglion mother cell
- OpenWorm
- History of microscale connectomics
