= Webknossos =

Open-source software

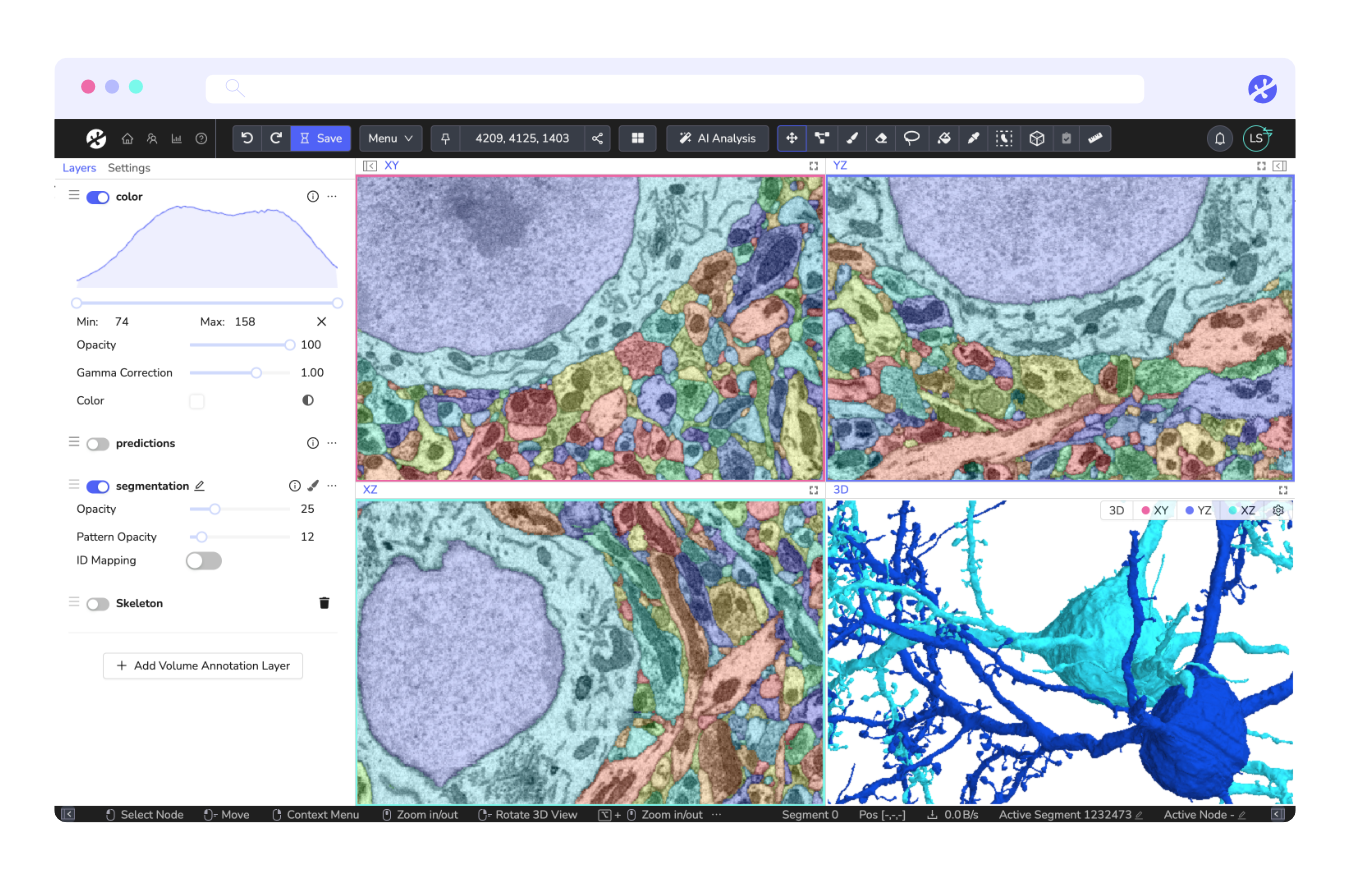
Webknossos UI for viewing a volume EM dataset from different viewports including the reconstructed 3D objects of the underlying tissue sample.

Webknossos (stylized in all caps) is an open-source software and online platform for viewing, annotating, and sharing large 3D images, primarily used by neuroscientists and cell biologists. It is capable of handling massive volume microscopy datasets, making it a valuable tool in the field of connectomics.

== Creation ==
Webknossos was developed by the company scalable minds in close collaboration with the Max Planck Institute for Brain Research, specifically with the Department of Connectomics led by Moritz Helmstaedter. It was designed to address the challenges of data analysis in connectomics. With the advancement of volume electron microscopy (vEM), datasets have expanded to sizes ranging from tens of terabytes (TB) to petabytes (PB), rendering the distribution of data on physical hard drives to numerous annotators impractical. The platform was conceived to facilitate efficient and distributed 3D data annotation for PB-sized datasets directly in web browsers.

== Applications ==
The software has been used in a number of applications for neuroscience research.

=== Neuron reconstruction ===
Webknossos facilitates both sparse and dense neuron reconstruction. Sparse annotations, generated with the skeleton annotation tools, can serve as evaluation data for assessing the performance of automated reconstruction models. For dense neuron reconstruction, researchers manually annotate neurons using volume annotation tools. This annotated data then frequently serves as ground truth for training Machine Learning models. The proofreading tools in Webknossos then assist in correcting split and merge errors through a supervoxel graph.

=== Connectomics Studies & Brain Mapping ===
Webknossos has been employed in several microscale connectomic research projects. Typically, after completing neuron reconstruction, users perform automated synapse detection following a similar workflow. They manually annotate synapses in Webknossos, train models on this data, and then apply these models to their datasets. The results are compared against the ground truth and can be refined. This process is also applied to neuron type identification. Once synapses and neuron types are detected, users can generate a connectome and explore it interactively in Webknossos. The platform allows users to click on a neuron to list all synaptic partners and view each synapse in the electron microscopy (EM) data.

=== Proofreading of automated reconstructions ===
Webknossos is utilized to correct errors in automated reconstructions from deep learning systems. The provided proof-reading tools allow users to explore reconstructed cells in 3D, identify merge or split errors, closely examine the mistakes in the EM data, and correct segments by splitting or merging them.

=== Neuronal tracing ===
The skeleton tools in Webknossos enable users to trace the morphology of neurons by creating trees with nodes and branch points, facilitating detailed neuronal tracing. With its unique Flight Mode feature, users can trace axons or dendrites at significantly higher speeds then conventional methods.

== Notable Publications ==
Webknossos has been used for the annotation and reconstruction of cells from various species, including mice, humans, macaques, drosophila, and more. Notable scientific studies that published their datasets as open access on Webknossos include:

- Connectomic comparison of mouse and human cortex
- Dense connectomic reconstruction in layer 4 of the somatosensory cortex
- Cell-type specific innervation of cortical pyramidal cells at their apical dendrites
- A connectomic study of a petascale fragment of human cerebral cortex
- Connectomic reconstruction of the inner plexiform layer in the mouse retina
- Electron Microscopic Mapping of Mitochondrial Morphology in the Cochlear Nerve Fibers
