= Optic lobe =

Optic lobe refers to brain structures involved in vision:

- The superior colliculus of mammals or the analogous optic tectum of other vertebrates, structures of the midbrain involved in vision
- Optic lobes of arthropods
