= Receptorome =

The receptorome is a concept analogue to the genome and proteome but also to other sets of structural or functional units such as the proteasome and connectome.

In analogy with the genome, where the genome is the total set of genes, the receptorome can be considered the total set of genes giving rise to receptors or receptor molecules. It could also be seen as the total number of receptor proteins in a certain organism.

The human receptorome constitutes at least 5% of the human genome. It encodes receptors that mediate the physiological, pathological and therapeutic responses to both exogenous and endogenous ligands.

Several in silico (on a chip) and physical screening methods have been devised to mine the receptorome efficiently and "mass-screening" substances towards a huge set of receptors to study effect and interaction.

In practice, the receptorome now is considered to encompass not only traditional receptors but also ion channels and transporters in the human genome that are potential drug targets. Some of the most renowned types are the G protein-coupled receptors (GPCR) - targets for many medications.

One of the most active areas of search for ligands to receptors, are in the field of brain receptors. In the hunt for psychopharmacologically active substances, psychoactive plant products are screened towards a receptorome array. Apart from finding new substances, discovering the molecular mechanisms responsible for these substances' actions will likely give insights into the molecular underpinnings of human consciousness.

An article on screening the GPCR-receptorome is: Mining the Receptorome.
