= Lamina monopolar cell =

Class of neurons

Lamina monopolar cells are a class of neurons in the most peripheral neuropil of the arthropod visual system, the lamina. Most insects, including flies, have five distinct classes lamina monopolar cells: L1, L2, L3, L4, and L5. L1, L2, L3, receive direct synaptic input from the photoreceptors in the lamina, and send axons into the second-order neuropil of the visual system, the medulla.
