= Connectomics =

Study of mapping wiring diagrams

Connectomics is the production and study of connectomes, which are comprehensive maps of connections within an organism's nervous system. Study of neuronal wiring diagrams looks at how they contribute to the health and behavior of an organism. There are two very different types of connectomes; microscale and macroscale. Microscale connectomics maps every neuron and synapse in an organism or chunk of tissue, typically using electron microscopy and histology. This level of detail is only possible for small animals (flies and worms) or tiny portions (less than 1 mm on a side) of large animal brains. Macroscale connectomics, on the other hand, refers to mapping out large fiber tracts and functional gray matter areas within a much larger brain (typically human), typically using forms of MRI to map out structure and function. Both fields simply refer to their maps as "connectomes".

Macroscale connectomics typically concentrates on the human nervous system, a network made of up to billions of connections and responsible for our thoughts, emotions, actions, memories, function and dysfunction. Because these structures are physically large and experiments on humans are routinely non-invasive, typical methods are functional and structural MRI data to measure blood flow (functional) and water diffusivity (structural). Examples include the Human Connectome Project and others. Connectomics in this regime aims to advance our understanding of mental health and cognition by understanding how cells in the nervous system are connected and communicate.

In contrast, microscale connectomics looks in much greater detail at much smaller circuits. In very small animals such as the worm C. elegans or the fruit fly Drosophila, the entire nervous system can be reconstructed. In the much larger mammal brains, studies examine subregions such as the retina and cortex. Connectomics at these scales searches for mechanistic explanations of how the nervous system operates.

== Methods ==
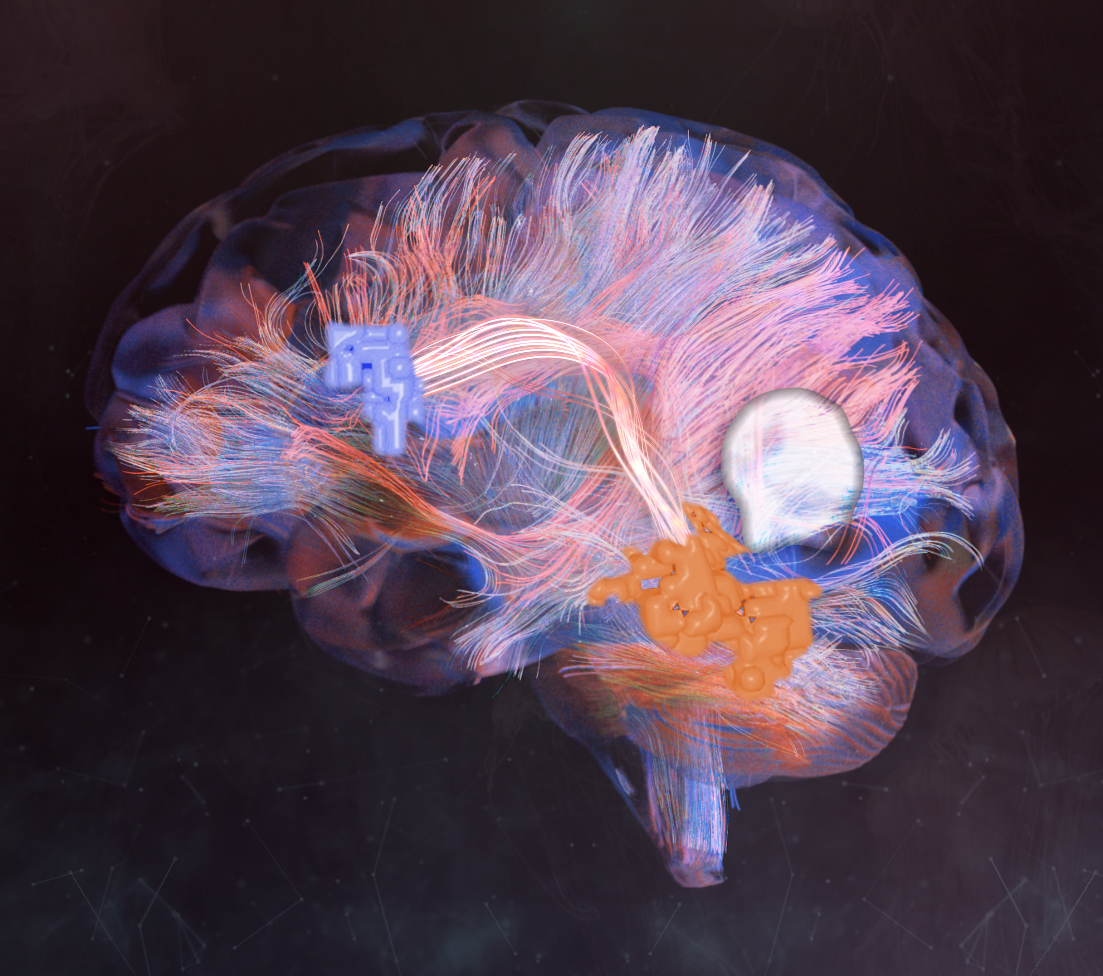
Diffusion magnetic resonance imaging is used to assess macroscale connectomics within the human brain. DW-MRI image series are used to map white matter tracts, and fMRI series are used to assess how blood flow correlates between connected gray matter areas.

=== Macroscale Connectomics ===
Macroscale connectomes are commonly collected using diffusion-weighted magnetic resonance imaging (DW-MRI) and functional magnetic resonance imaging (fMRI). DW-MRI datasets can span the entire brain, imaging white matter between the cortex and subcortex, providing information about the diffusion of water molecules in brain tissue, and allowing researchers to infer the orientation and integrity of white matter pathways. DW-MRI can be used in conjunction with tractography where it enables the reconstruction of white matter tracts in the brain. It does so by measuring the diffusion of water molecules in multiple directions, as DW-MRI can estimate the local fiber orientations and generate a model of the brain's fiber pathways. Meanwhile, tractography algorithms trace the likely trajectories of these pathways, providing a representation of the brain's anatomical connectivity. Metrics such as fractional anisotropy (FA), mean diffusivity (MD), or connectivity strength can be computed from DW-MRI data to assess the microstructural properties of white matter and quantify the strength of (long-range) connections between brain regions.

In contrast to DW-MRI, fMRI measures the blood oxygenation level-dependent (BOLD) signal, which reflects changes in cerebral blood flow and oxygenation associated with neural activity, as regulated by the neurovascular unit. When used together, a resting-state fMRI and a DW-MRI dataset provide a comprehensive view of how regions of the brain are structurally connected, and how closely they are communicating. Resting-state functional connectivity (RSFC) analysis is a common method to measure connectomes using fMRI that involves acquiring fMRI data while the subject is at rest and not performing any specific tasks or stimuli. RSFC examines the temporal correlation of the BOLD signals between different brain regions (after accounting for the confounding effect of other regions), providing insights into functional connectivity.

==== Stimulation ====
Techniques that actively manipulate the brain, often called neuromodulation, can provide insights into the connectome. For example, transcranial magnetic stimulation (TMS) is a non-invasive neuromodulation technique that applies strong magnetic pulses between scalp electrodes which target specific brain regions with electrical currents. This can temporarily disrupt or enhance the activity of specific brain areas and observe changes in connectivity. Transcranial direct current stimulation (tDCS) is another non-invasive neuromodulation technique that applies a constant but relatively weak electrical current for a few minutes, modulating neuronal excitability. It allows researchers to investigate the causal relationship between targeted brain regions and changes in connectivity. tDCS increases the functional connectivity within the brain, with a bias towards specific networks (e.g., cortical processing), and may even cause structural changes to take place in the white matter via myelination and in the gray matter via synaptic plasticity. Another neuromodulation technique is deep brain stimulation (DBS), an invasive technique that involves surgically implanting electrodes into specific brain regions in order to apply localized, high-frequency electrical impulses. This technique modulates brain networks and is often used to alleviate motor symptoms from disorders like Parkinson's, essential tremor, and dystonia. The functional and structural connectivity between electrodes can be used to predict patient outcomes and estimate optimal connectivity profiles.

==== Electrophysiological Methods ====
Electrophysiological methods measure the difference in signals from different parts of the brain to estimate the connectivity between them, a process that requires a low signal-to-noise ratio to maintain the accuracy of the measurements and sufficient spatial resolution to support the connectivity between specific regions of the brain. These methods offer insights into real-time neural dynamics and functional connectivity between brain regions. Electroencephalography (EEG) measures the differences in the electrical potential generated by oscillating currents at the surface of the scalp, due to the non-invasive, external placement of the electrodes. Meanwhile, magnetoencephalography (MEG) relies on the magnetic fields generated by the electrical activity of the brain to collect information.

=== Microscale Connectomics ===
Microscale connectomes focuses on resolving individual cell-to-cell connectivity within much smaller volumes of nervous system tissue. The most common method for neural circuit reconstruction is chemical brain preservation followed by 3D electron microscopy, which offers single synapse resolution. The first microscale connectome encompassing an entire nervous system was produced for the nematode C. elegans in 1986. This was done by manually annotating printouts of the EM scans. Advances in EM acquisition, image alignment and segmentation, and manipulation of large datasets have since allowed for larger volumes to be imaged and segmented more easily. EM has been used to produce connectomes from a variety of nervous system samples, including publicly available datasets that encompass the full body of a Platynereis dumerilii larva, the entire brain and ventral nerve cord of adult Drosophila melanogaster, the full central nervous system (connected brain and ventral nerve cord) of larval Drosophila melanogaster, and volumes from mouse and human cortex. The National Institutes of Health (NIH) has now invested in creating an EM connectome of an entire mouse brain. EM can be combined with fluorescence in correlative microscopy, which can generate more interpretable data as is it able to automatically detect specific neuron types and can trace them in their entirety using fluorescent markers.

Other imaging modalities are approaching the nanometer-scale resolution necessary for microscale connectomics. X-ray nanotomography using a synchrotron source can now reach <100 nm resolution, and can theoretically continue to improve. Unlike EM, this technique does not require the tissue being imaged to be stained with heavy metals or to be physically sectioned. Conventional light microscopy is constrained by light diffraction. Researchers have recently used stimulated emission depletion (STED) microscopy, a super-resolution light microscopy technique, to image the extracellular space of living human brain organoids and mouse hippocampal slice cultures, allowing for reconstruction of all neurites within this volume by implementing a two-stage machine learning approach. They combined this with fluorescently-tagged synaptic markers to find synaptic connectivity in the sample as well as with calcium imaging to monitor neuronal activity . However, this live-imaging approach was limited to ~130 nm resolution, and was therefore not able to reliably reconstruct thin axons over long distances. In 2024, a new technique called LICONN combined hydrogel expansion with light microscopy (as opposed to electron microscopy) to generate neuron level connectomes. Potential advantages include cheaper equipment (optical vs EM microscopes), faster data acquisition, and multi-color labelling.

=== Software ===
In addition to advanced microscopy techniques, connectomics heavily relies on software analysis tools and machine learning pipelines for reconstructing and analyzing neural networks. These tools are designed to process and interpret the vast amounts of data generated by volume electron microscopy and other imaging methods. Key steps in connectomic reconstruction include image segmentation, where individual neurons and their components are identified and annotated, and network mapping, where the connections between these neurons are established.

Several software platforms facilitate these tasks. CATMAID (Collaborative Annotation Toolkit for Massive Amounts of Image Data) is a decentralized web interface allowing seamless navigation of large image stacks. It is designed to facilitate the collaborative exploration, annotation, and efficient sharing of regions of interests by bookmarking. Another example is WEBKNOSSOS, an online platform used for viewing, annotating, and sharing large 3D images, aiding in the detailed analysis of neural structures by allowing efficient navigation and annotation of 3D datasets. Neuroglancer, a web-based tool designed for visualizing and navigating large-scale neuroscience data, offers features like 3D rendering and interactive exploration of brain datasets.

== Examples ==
To see one of the first micro-connectomes at full-resolution, visit the Open Connectome Project, which is hosting several connectome datasets, including the 12TB dataset from Bock et al. (2011).

== Comparative connectomics ==
Comparative connectomics is a subfield in neuroscience that focuses on comparing the connectomes, or neural network maps, across different species, developmental stages, or pathological states. This comparative approach aims to uncover fundamental principles of brain organization and function by identifying conserved and divergent patterns in neural circuitry. By analyzing similarities and differences in the wiring diagrams of various organisms, researchers can gain insights into the evolutionary processes shaping the nervous system, as well as into the neural basis of behavior and cognition.

For example, a 2022 study comparing synaptic connectivity in the mouse and human/macaque cortex revealed that, even though the human cortex contains three times more interneurons than the mouse cortex, the excitation-to-inhibition ratio is similar between the species. Another study explicitly examined the differences between the male and female nervous systems of Drosophila melanogaster.

== Plasticity of the connectome ==
At the beginning of the connectome project, it was thought that the connections between neurons were unchangeable once established and that only individual synapses could be altered. However, recent evidence suggests that connectivity is also subject to change, termed neuroplasticity. There are two ways that the brain can rewire: formation and removal of synapses in an established connection or formation or removal of entire connections between neurons. Both mechanisms of rewiring are useful for learning completely novel tasks that may require entirely new connections between regions of the brain. However, the ability of the brain to gain or lose entire connections poses an issue for mapping a universal species connectome. Although rewiring happens on different scales, from microscale to macroscale, each scale does not occur in isolation. For example, in the C. elegans connectome, the total number of synapses increases 5-fold from birth to adulthood, changing both local and global network properties. Other developmental connectomes, such as the muscle connectome, retain some global network properties even though the number of synapses decreases by 10-fold in early postnatal life.

=== Macroscale rewiring ===
Evidence for macroscale rewiring mostly comes from research on grey and white matter density, which could indicate new connections or changes in axon density. Direct evidence for this level of rewiring comes from primate studies, using viral tracing to map the formation of connections. Primates that were taught to use novel tools developed new connections between the interparietal cortex and higher visual areas of the brain. Further viral tracing studies have provided evidence that macroscale rewiring occurs in adult animals during associative learning. However, it is not likely that long-distance neural connections undergo extensive rewiring in adults. Small changes in an already established nerve tract are likely what is observed in macroscale rewiring.

=== Mesoscale rewiring ===
Rewiring at the mesoscale involves studying the presence or absence of entire connections between neurons. Evidence for this level of rewiring comes from observations that local circuits form new connections as a result of experience-dependent plasticity in the visual cortex. Additionally, the number of local connections between pyramidal neurons in the primary somatosensory cortex increases following altered whisker sensory experience in rodents.

=== Microscale rewiring ===
Microscale rewiring is the formation or removal of synaptic connections between two neurons and can be studied with longitudinal two-photon imaging. Dendritic spines on pyramidal neurons can be shown forming within days following sensory experience and learning. Changes can even be seen within five hours on apical tufts of layer five pyramidal neurons in the primary motor cortex after a seed reaching task in primates.

== Model systems ==
For macroscale connectomes, the most common subject is the human. For microscale connectomes, some of the model systems are the mouse, the fruit fly, the nematode C. elegans, and the barn owl. C. elegans and the fruit fly have the advantage that their nervous systems are small enough to be reconstructed in their entirety, plus the organisms are well studied in other domains, such as genetics and behavior. The mouse, the human, and the owl are vertebrates and mammals, with larger and more capable nervous systems, but their brains are much too large to reconstruct completely as of 2025.

A scientific advantage of an optically transparent organism such as Danionella or larval zebrafish is that they allow neural activity recordings (typically calcium imaging) to be performed in the same animal that will later be used for neural circuit reconstruction. This allows researchers to bypass many of the animal-to-animal variability problems caused when trying to correlate the behavior observed in one animal with the reconstructed circuitry of a different animal.

=== Humans ===
The Human Connectome Project (HCP) was an initiative launched in 2009 by the National Institutes of Health (NIH) to map the macroscale neural pathways that underlie human brain function. Additional programs within the Connectome Initiative, such as the Lifespan Connectome and Disease Connectome, focus on mapping brain connections across different age groups and studying connectome variations in individuals with specific clinical diagnoses. The Connectome Coordination Facility serves as a centralized repository for HCP data and provides support to researchers.

=== Caenorhabditis Elegans ===
The C. elegans roundworm has a simple nervous system of 302 neurons and 5000 synaptic connections, (as compared to the human brain which has 100 billion neurons and more than 100 trillion chemical synapses). It was the first of the very few animals in which a full connectome has been mapped using various imaging techniques, mainly serial-electron microscopy. This has made it a natural target for connectomics.

One project studied the aging process of the C. elegans brain by comparing varying worms from birth to adulthood. Researchers found the biggest change with age is the wiring circuits, and that connectivity between and within brain regions increases with age. Additional findings are likely through comparative connectomics, comparing and contrasting different species' brain networks to pinpoint relations in behavior.

Another study analyzed connections about sensory neurons, interneurons, neck motor neurons, behavior, environmental influences, and more in detail.

=== Fruit Fly ===
Within the last decade, largely owing to technological advancements in EM data collection and image processing, multiple synapse-scale connectome datasets have been generated for the fruit fly Drosophila melanogaster in its adult and larval forms. The full fly connectome contains on the order of 150 thousand neurons and 300 million synapses.

The largest current dataset is central nervous system (CNS) of the male, consisting of both the brain and ventral nerve cord. Next in size is the CNS of the female, though not as completely reconstructed. Another large dataset, but not including the nerve cord, is the FlyWire segmentation and annotation of the female adult fly brain (FAFB) volume, which encompasses the entire brain of an adult. Another adult brain dataset available is the Hemibrain, generated as a collaboration between the Janelia FlyEM team and Google. This dataset is an incomplete but large section of the fly central brain. There are also currently two publicly available datasets of the adult fly ventral nerve cord (VNC). The female adult nerve cord (FANC) was collected using high-throughput SEM by Dr. Wei-Chung Allen Lee's lab at Harvard Medical School. The male adult nerve cord (MANC) was collected at Janelia using FIB-SEM. The connectome of a complete central nervous system (connected brain and VNC) of a 1st instar D. melanogaster larva has been collected as a single volume. This dataset of 3016 neurons was segmented and annotated manually using CATMAID by a team of people mainly led by researchers at Janelia, Cambridge, and the MRC LMB.

=== Mouse ===
An online database known as MouseLight displays over 1000 neurons mapped in the mouse brain based on a collective database of sub-micron resolution images of these brains. This platform illustrates the thalamus, hippocampus, cerebral cortex, and hypothalamus based on single-cell projections. Imaging technology to produce this mouse brain does not allow an in-depth look at synapses but can show axonal arborizations which contain many synapses. A limiting factor to studying mouse connectomes, much like with humans, is the complexity of labeling all the cell types of the mouse brain; This is a process that would require the reconstruction of 100,000+ neurons and the imaging technology is advanced enough to do so.

Mice models in the lab have provided insight into genetic brain disorders, one study manipulated mice with a deletion of 22q11.2 (chromosome 22, a likely known genetic risk factor that leads to schizophrenia). The findings of this study showed that this impaired neural activity in mice's working memory is similar to what it does in humans.

== Applications ==
Macroscale and microscale connectomics have very different applications. Macroscale connectomics has furthered our understanding of various brain networks including visual, brainstem, and language networks, among others. Microscale connectomics, on the other hand, concentrates on mechanistic explanations of how the neural circuits of the brain perform specific functions. Examples include motion vision, olfactory learning, navigation, and escape responses, all in Drosophila.

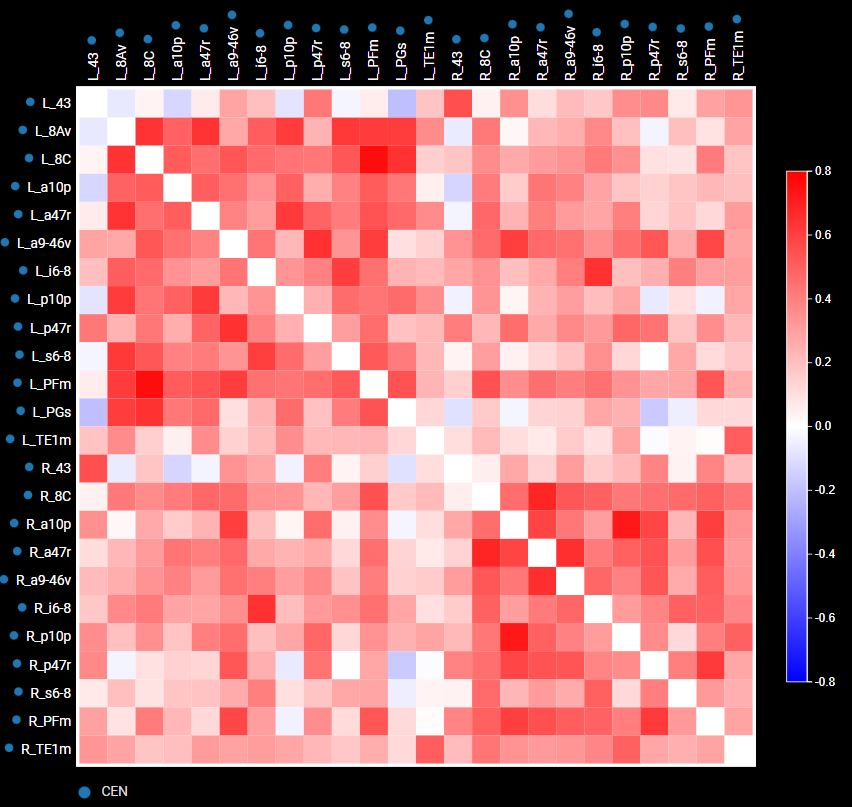
A connectivity matrix assessing the functional connectivity between each brain region in the Default Mode Network (DMN). Here, shades of red indicate stronger coupling between two regions blood flow changes, and shades of blue indicate an anti-correlation between two regions.

By comparing diseased and healthy connectomes, we can gain insight into certain psychopathologies, such as neuropathic pain, and potential therapies for them. Generally, the field of neuroscience would benefit from standardization and raw data. For example, connectome maps can be used to inform computational models of whole-brain dynamics. Current neural networks mostly rely on probabilistic representations of connectivity patterns. Connectivity matrices (checkerboard diagrams of connectomics) have been used in stroke recovery to evaluate the response to treatment via Transcranial Magnetic Stimulation. Similarly, connectograms (circular diagrams of connectomics) have been used in traumatic brain injury cases to document the extent of damage to neural networks.

Looking into these methods of research, they can reveal information about different mental illnesses and brain disorders. The tracking of brain networks in alignment with diseases and illnesses would be enhanced by these advanced technologies that can produce complex images of neural networks. With this in mind, diseases can not only be tracked, but predicted based on behavior of previous cases, a process that would take an extensive period of time to collect and record. Specifically, studies on different brain disorders such as schizophrenia and bipolar disorder with a focus on the connectomics involved reveal information. Both of these disorders have a similar genetic origin, and research found that those with higher polygenic scores for schizophrenia and bipolar disorder have lower amounts of connectivity shown through neuroimaging. This method of research tackles real-world applications of connectomics, combining methods of imaging with genetics to dig deeper into the origins and outcomes of genetically related disorders. Another study supports the finding that there is relation between connectivity and likelihood of disease, as researchers found those diagnosed with schizophrenia have less structurally complete brain networks. The main drawback in this area of connectomics is not being able to achieve images of whole-brain networks, therefore it is hard to make complete and accurate assumptions about cause and effect of diseases' neural pathways. Connectomics has been used to study patients with strokes using MRI imaging, however because such little research is done in this specific area, conclusions cannot be drawn regarding the relation between strokes and connectivity. The research did find results that highlight an association between poor connectivity in the language system and poor motor coordination, however the results were not substantial enough to make a bold claim. For behavioral disorders, it can be difficult to diagnose and treat because most situations revolve on a symptoms-based approach. However, this can be difficult because many disorders have overlapping symptoms. Connectomics has been used to find neuromarkers associated with social anxiety disorder (SAD) at a high precision rate in improving related symptoms. This is an expanding field and there is room for greater application to mental health disorders and brain malfunction, in which current research is building on neural networks and the psychopathology involved.

Human connectomes have an individual variability, which can be measured with the cumulative distribution function, as it was shown in. By analyzing the individual variability of the human connectomes in distinct cerebral areas, it was found that the frontal and the limbic lobes are more conservative, and the edges in the temporal and occipital lobes are more diverse. A "hybrid" conservative/diverse distribution was detected in the paracentral lobule and the fusiform gyrus. Smaller cortical areas were also evaluated: precentral gyri were found to be more conservative, and the postcentral and the superior temporal gyri to be very diverse.

== Comparison to genomics ==
Both connectomics and genomics involve hugely detailed datasets of complex biological systems, derived by large and expensive research efforts. Genomics, the earlier of the two, focuses on the genetic blueprint of an organism while connectomics reveals the structural and functional connectivity of the brain. Comparisons of the two efforts often concentrate on what connectomics can learn from the more mature field of genomics.

By using results from both connectomics and genomics, researchers can explore how genetic variations and gene expression patterns influence the wiring and organization of neural circuits. This interdisciplinary approach helps uncover the relationship between genes, neural connectivity, and brain function. Understanding the genetic basis of neural connectivity can enhance our understanding of brain development, neural plasticity, and the mechanisms underlying various neurological disorders. Additionally, biologists can augment their analysis of circuits found by connectomics by using genetic tools and techniques to manipulate specific genes or neuronal populations to study their impact on neural circuitry and behavior.

The Human Genome Project initially faced many of the same initial accusations of expense and impracticality leveled at connectomics. In the end, however, it was completed ahead of schedule and has led to many advances in genetics. Given the analogies between the two efforts, some have argued that we should be at least slightly more optimistic about the prospects in connectomics. Others, however, have criticized attempts towards a microscale connectome, arguing that we do not have enough knowledge about where to look for insights, or that it cannot be completed within a realistic time frame.

== Mapping functional connectivity ==
Using fMRI in the resting state and during tasks, functions of the connectome circuits are being studied. Just as detailed road maps of the Earth's surface do not tell us much about the kind of vehicles that travel those roads or what cargo they are hauling, to understand how neural structures result in specific functional behavior such as consciousness, it is necessary to build theories that relate functions to anatomical connectivity. However, the bond between structural and functional connectivity is not straightforward. Computational models of whole-brain network dynamics are valuable tools to investigate the role of the anatomical network in shaping functional connectivity. In particular, computational models can be used to predict the dynamic effect of lesions in the connectome.

== As a network or graph ==
A connectome can be viewed as a graph, and the rich tools, definitions and algorithms of graph theory and network science can be applied to these graphs. In case of a micro-scale connectome, the nodes of this network (or graph) are the neurons, and the edges correspond to the synapses between those neurons. For the macro-scale connectome, the nodes correspond to the ROIs (regions of interest), while the edges of the graph are derived from the axons interconnecting those areas. Thus connectomes are sometimes referred to as brain graphs, as they are indeed graphs in a mathematical sense which describe the connections in the brain (or, in a broader sense, the whole nervous system).

One group of researchers (Iturria-Medina et al., 2008) has constructed connectome data sets using diffusion tensor imaging (DTI) followed by the derivation of average connection probabilities between 70 and 90 cortical and basal brain gray matter areas. All networks were found to have small-world attributes and "broad-scale" degree distributions. An analysis of betweenness centrality in these networks demonstrated high centrality for the precuneus, the insula, the superior parietal and the superior frontal cortex. Another group (Gong et al. 2008) has applied DTI to map a network of anatomical connections between 78 cortical regions. This study also identified several hub regions in the human brain, including the precuneus and the superior frontal gyrus.

Hagmann et al. (2007) constructed a connection matrix from fiber densities measured between homogeneously distributed and equal-sized ROIs numbering between 500 and 4000. A quantitative analysis of connection matrices obtained for approximately 1,000 ROIs and approximately 50,000 fiber pathways from two subjects demonstrated an exponential (one-scale) degree distribution as well as robust small-world attributes for the network. The data sets were derived from diffusion spectrum imaging (DSI) (Wedeen, 2005), a variant of diffusion-weighted imaging that is sensitive to intra-voxel heterogeneities in diffusion directions caused by crossing fiber tracts and thus allows more accurate mapping of axonal trajectories than other diffusion imaging approaches (Wedeen, 2008). The combination of whole-head DSI datasets acquired and processed according to the approach developed by Hagmann et al. (2007) with the graph analysis tools conceived initially for animal tracing studies (Sporns, 2006; Sporns, 2007) allow a detailed study of the network structure of human cortical connectivity (Hagmann et al., 2008). The human brain network was characterized using a broad array of network analysis methods including core decomposition, modularity analysis, hub classification and centrality. Hagmann et al. presented evidence for the existence of a structural core of highly and mutually interconnected brain regions, located primarily in posterior medial and parietal cortex. The core comprises portions of the posterior cingulate cortex, the precuneus, the cuneus, the paracentral lobule, the isthmus of the cingulate, the banks of the superior temporal sulcus, and the inferior and superior parietal cortex, all located in both cerebral hemispheres.

A subfield of connectomics deals with the comparison of the brain graphs of multiple subjects. It is possible to build a consensus graph such the Budapest Reference Connectome by allowing only edges that are present in at least $k$ connectomes, for a selectable $k$ parameter. The Budapest Reference Connectome has led the researchers to the discovery of the Consensus Connectome Dynamics of the human brain graphs. The edges appeared in all of the brain graphs form a connected subgraph around the brainstem. By allowing gradually less frequent edges, this core subgraph grows continuously, as a shrub. The growth dynamics may reflect the individual brain development and provide an opportunity to direct some edges of the human consensus brain graph.

Alternatively, local difference which are statistically significantly different among groups have attracted more attention as they highlight specific connections and therefore shed more light on specific brain traits or pathology. Hence, algorithms to find local difference between graph populations have also been introduced (e.g. to compare case versus control groups). Those can be found by using either an adjusted t-test, or a sparsity model, with the aim of finding statistically significant connections which are different among those groups.

Comparisons between the connectomes (or braingraphs) of healthy women and men have shown that in several deep graph-theoretical parameters, the structural connectome of women is significantly better connected than that of men. For example, women's connectome has more edges, higher minimum bipartition width, larger eigengap, greater minimum vertex cover than that of men. The minimum bipartition width (or, in other words, the minimum balanced cut) is a well-known measure of quality of computer multistage interconnection networks, it describes the possible bottlenecks in network communication: The higher this value is, the better is the network. The larger eigengap shows that the female connectome is better expander graph than the connectome of males. The better expanding property, the higher minimum bipartition width and the greater minimum vertex cover show deep advantages in network connectivity in the case of female braingraph.

Connectomes generally exhibit a small-world character, with overall cortical connectivity decreasing with age. The aim of the as of 2015 ongoing HCP Lifespan Pilot Project is to identify connectome differences between 6 age groups (4–6, 8–9, 14–15, 25–35, 45–55, 65–75).

More recently, connectograms have been used to visualize full-brain data by placing cortical areas around a circle, organized by lobe. Inner circles then depict cortical metrics on a color scale. White matter fiber connections in DTI data are then drawn between these cortical regions and weighted by fractional anisotropy and strength of the connection. Such graphs have even been used to analyze the damage done to the famous traumatic brain injury patient Phineas Gage.

Statistical graph theory is an emerging discipline which is developing sophisticated pattern recognition and inference tools to parse these brain graphs (Goldenberg et al., 2009).

== Origin and usage of the term ==
In 2005, Dr. Olaf Sporns at Indiana University and Dr. Patric Hagmann at Lausanne University Hospital independently and simultaneously suggested the term "connectome" to refer to a map of the neural connections within the brain. This term was directly inspired by the ongoing effort to sequence the human genetic code—to build a genome.

"Connectomics" has been defined as the science concerned with assembling and analyzing connectome data sets.

In their 2005 paper, "The Human Connectome, a structural description of the human brain", Sporns et al. wrote:

To understand the functioning of a network, one must know its elements and their interconnections. The purpose of this article is to discuss research strategies aimed at a comprehensive structural description of the network of elements and connections forming the human brain. We propose to call this dataset the human "connectome," and we argue that it is fundamentally important in cognitive neuroscience and neuropsychology. The connectome will significantly increase our understanding of how functional brain states emerge from their underlying structural substrate, and will provide new mechanistic insights into how brain function is affected if this structural substrate is disrupted.

In his 2005 Ph.D. thesis, From diffusion MRI to brain connectomics, Hagmann wrote:

It is clear that, like the genome, which is much more than just a juxtaposition of genes, the set of all neuronal connections in the brain is much more than the sum of their individual components. The genome is an entity it-self, as it is from the subtle gene interaction that [life] emerges. In a similar manner, one could consider the brain connectome, set of all neuronal connections, as one single entity, thus emphasizing the fact that the huge brain neuronal communication capacity and computational power critically relies on this subtle and incredibly complex connectivity architecture.

The term "connectome" was more recently popularized by Sebastian Seung's I am my Connectome speech given at the 2010 TED conference, which discusses the high-level goals of mapping the human connectome, as well as ongoing efforts to build a three-dimensional neural map of brain tissue at the microscale. In 2012, Seung published the book Connectome: How the Brain's Wiring Makes Us Who We Are.

== Public datasets ==
Websites to explore publicly available connectomics datasets:

Macroscale Connectomics (Healthy Young Adult Datasets)

- Human Connectome Project Young Adult
- Amsterdam Open MRI Collection
- Harvard Brain Genomic Superstruct Project

For a more comprehensive list of open macroscale datasets, check out this article

Microscale Connectomics

- Whole C. elegans connectome
- Whole Platynereis dumerilii larva connectome
- NeuPRINT Fly Hemibrain, Male VNC, Male Complete CNS
- Flywire (whole fly brain)
- MICrONS Explorer (mouse cortical data)
- H01 Browser Release (human cortical data)
- Connectomic comparison of mouse and human cortex (mouse, macaque, and human cortical data)

== See also ==
- Dynamic Functional Connectivity
- List of Functional Connectivity Software
- Human Connectome Project
- Budapest Reference Connectome
- Drosophila connectome
- History of microscale connectomics
- https://eyewire.org/explore
