= Danionella mirifica =

Conservation status
- Data Deficient (IUCN 3.1)

Scientific classification
- Kingdom: Animalia
- Phylum: Chordata
- Class: Actinopterygii
- Order: Cypriniformes
- Family: Danionidae
- Subfamily: Danioninae
- Genus: Danionella
- Species: D. mirifica

Binomial name
- Danionella mirifica Britz, 2003

Species of fish

Danionella mirifica is a species of freshwater ray-finned fish belonging to the family Danionidae. It is endemic to northern Myanmar and only known from its type locality in Myitkyina District. It is a small species, growing to 1.4 cm (0.55 in) standard length.
