= Dysfunctome =

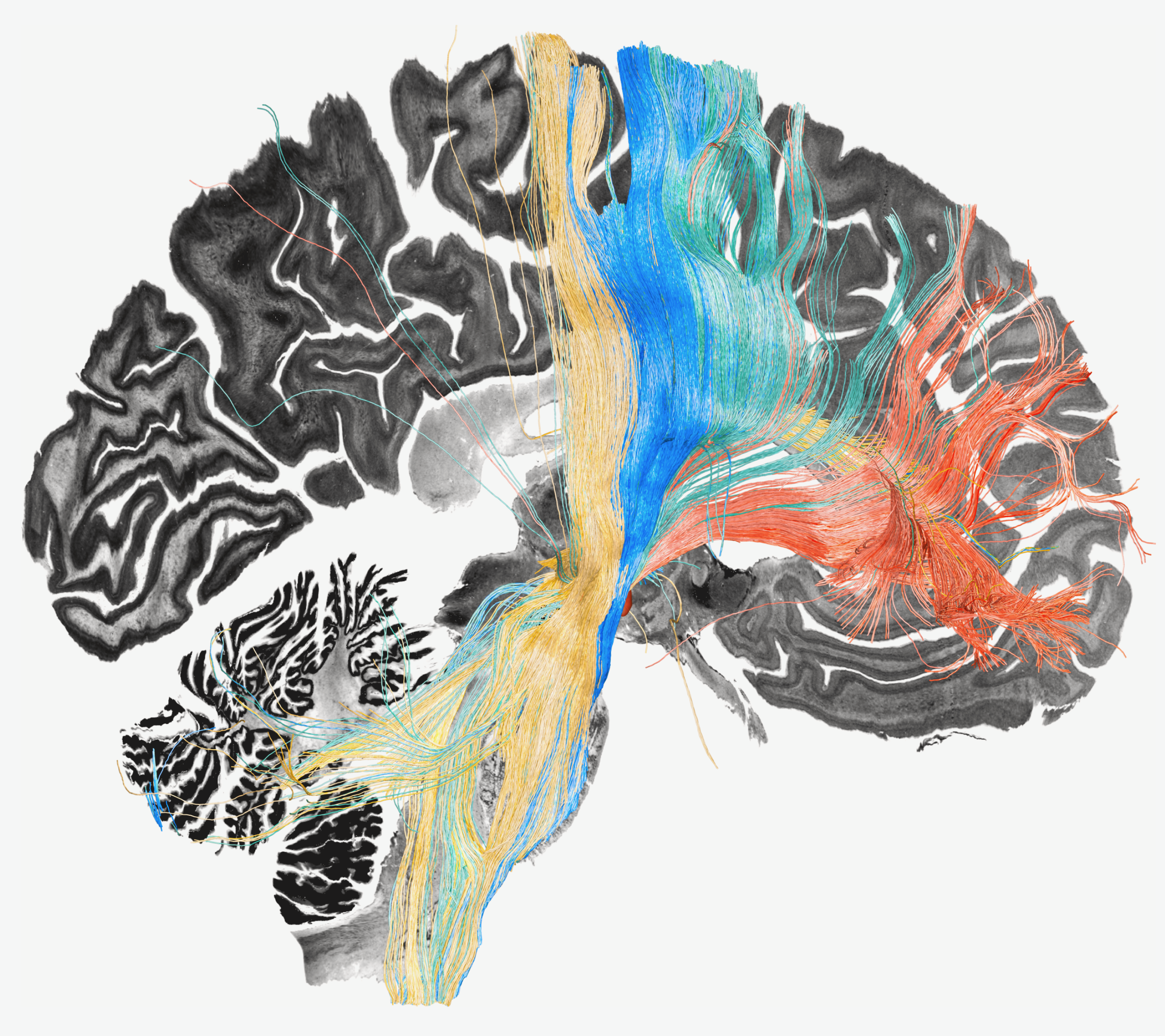
Fiber bundles that are dysfunctional and when suppressed associated with symptom improvement following deep brain stimulation in Parkinson's disease (green), dystonia (yellow), Tourette's syndrome (blue), and obsessive-compulsive disorder (red).

The dysfunctome is a proposed conceptual framework that describes a library of circuits that may become dysfunctional in the human brain as a consequence of various brain disorders. Analogous to terms like the genome (the total genetic information of an organism), the proteome (the entire set of proteins expressed) and the connectome (the parts of the entire brain and their interconnections) the dysfunctome aims to map out how disruptions—of whichever nature—contribute to disease states and pathological signs or symptoms if specific brain circuits become dysfunctional.

== Description ==
An increasingly adopted view is that many symptoms of neurological or psychiatric diseases originate from brain circuit dysfunctions, which have also been termed 'oscillopathies' or 'disorders of the connectome'. Indeed, evidence accumulates, that the same circuit may be responsible for the same symptom as expressed by patients with different diseases. Examples include a dysfunctional circuit between cerebellar nuclei, the cerebellar receiving thalamus and primary motor cortex, which has been associated with various forms of tremor in disorders such as Parkinson's Disease, Essential Tremor, Multiple Sclerosis and other disorders. Similarly, a common circuit involved in obsessive compulsive behavior has been identified to play a role in OCD and Tourette's Syndrome.

Finally, a shared polysynaptic brain network has been associated with the occurrence of depression in Major depression, epilepsy and Parkinson's Disease. This transnosologic view, which associates brain circuit disruption with symptoms, rather with disorders, is also reflected by the Research Domain Criteria (RDoC) concept by the National Institutes of Mental Health.

In this light, the hypothetical concept of the dysfunctome aims at constructing an exhaustive library that maps circuits, which, when dysfunctional, will lead to a given neurological or psychiatric symptom. Critically, the concept does not specify the nature of the dysfunction, which could include hyper-/hypoactivity, loss of sensible information processing, microseizures or other disruptions that could unfold along brain circuits.

== Etymology ==
The term "dysfunctome" combines "dysfunction," referring to the impaired or abnormal functioning of processes, with the suffix "-ome," commonly used to denote a totality or complete set (e.g., genome, metabolome, microbiome). The concept underscores the importance of comprehensive, system-wide approaches to understanding diseases, moving beyond the study of individual brain circuits or individual pathological symptoms.

== See also ==
- Connectome
- Genome
- Proteome
- Systems Biology
- Personalized Medicine
