= Projectome =

Database of neural connections

A projectome is a database or list of all neural connections made by neurons that project from one structure of the nervous system (e.g. a ganglion or a brain nucleus) to another. Thus, a projectome is a subset of a connectome, since a connectome lists not only the connections between the structures, but also within them. Once a complete connectome of an organism is known, the projectome can be derived from it.

Projectomics, a branch of neuroinformatics, is defined as long-range connectomics. Term projectome was introduced in 2007 by Kasthuri and Lichtman.
