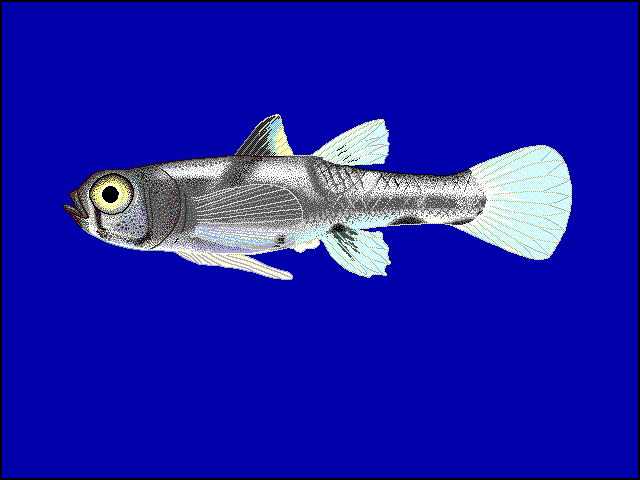

Conservation status
- Data Deficient (IUCN 3.1)

Scientific classification
- Kingdom: Animalia
- Phylum: Chordata
- Class: Actinopterygii
- Order: Gobiiformes
- Family: Oxudercidae
- Genus: Pandaka
- Species: P. pygmaea

Binomial name
- Pandaka pygmaea Herre, 1927

= Dwarf pygmy goby =

Species of fish

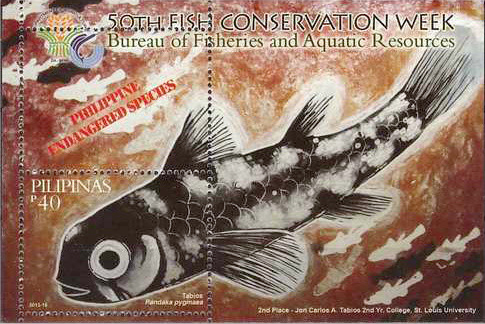
Pandaka pygmaea on a 2013 stamp sheet of the Philippines

The dwarf pygmy goby or Philippine goby (Pandaka pygmaea) is a tropical species of fish in the subfamily Gobionellinae from brackish water and mangrove areas in Southeast Asia. It is one of the smallest fish species in the world. Males reach maturity at a standard length of 0.9 cm (0.35 in) and can reach up to 1.1 cm (0.43 in) in standard length, while the females can grow up to 1.5 centimetres (0.59 in) in total length. Adults weigh around 425 milligrams (0.015 oz). It is known as bia and tabios in the Philippines.

== Distribution and habitat ==
P. pygmaea was initially reported as being endemic to Malabon, Metro Manila in the Philippines, where found at shady river banks. The species has now been extirpated from this area as it was reclaimed, leading to its status as critically endangered by the IUCN. More recently, it has been discovered at a range of other locations in Southeast Asia, including Culion Island, Bali, Sulawesi and Singapore. As part of the aquarium trade, it was imported into Germany in 1958.

P. pygmaea lives in shallow, tropical brackish water and mangrove areas where mainly found on muddy bottoms or among plants. Also known before as National Fish in the Philippines on 1994 until recently they changed it to milk fish.

== Appearance and anatomy ==
A colorless and nearly transparent species, the dwarf pygmy goby has a moderately elongated and robust body. Males are slender with nearly straight dorsal and ventral profiles, while the females appear stouter with the dorsal profile slightly curved, the belly protuberant, and the ventral outline strongly arched.

The head of the P. pygmaea is large and blunt. The head and nape are naked. The upper and lower profiles converge and are pointed if viewed from the sides. The head is characteristically broader than deep. The head is very short, broad and rounded. The mouth is very oblique, with a projecting lower jaw and chin. The posterior angle of the maxillary extends beneath the anterior part of the eye, up to the middle of pupil. It possesses two rows of teeth in each jaw. The outer row of teeth inside the upper jaw is larger and more widely spaced, while the inner row is characteristically minute. The first dorsal fin is low, much in advance of the second dorsal fin but not reaching the second dorsal fin when depressed. The pectoral and ventral fins are pointed, with the latter about as long as the former or longer. The anal papilla is very short and rounded in females, but is longer and very slender in males.

P. pygmaea have dark spots, which forms 4 cross-bands, over the sides of its body. The bases of the fins are heavily pigmented, except for the ventral fins. It has 22 to 25 scales in longitudinal series.

== Behavior ==
=== Feeding ===
This species feeds on plankton.

=== Reproduction ===
P. pygmaea is an oviparous species.

== Miscellaneous ==
Pandaka pygmaea was once portrayed on a Philippine ten centavo coin where, uniquely for a wildlife portrayal on coinage, it is depicted at life-size. The genus name is derived from the Filipino word pandak, meaning "dwarf" or "short of stature".

== See also ==
- Seven-figure pygmy goby
