= Microphilypnus =

Scientific classification
- Kingdom: Animalia
- Phylum: Chordata
- Class: Actinopterygii
- Order: Gobiiformes
- Family: Eleotridae
- Genus: Microphilypnus; G. S. Myers, 1927

Type species
- Microphilypnus ternetzi G. S. Myers, 1927

Genus of fishes

Microphilypnus is a genus of small fishes in the family Eleotridae native to the Amazon and Orinoco basins in South America. At up to 2.4 cm (0.94 in) in standard length, they are among the smallest sleeper gobies, but however larger than the Leptophilypnion sleeper gobies from the same region. The bottom-dwelling Microphilypnus are typically found in shallow water among leaf-litter or partially buried in sand, and they can be very abundant in their habitat. Their small size combined with a speckled and semi-transparent appearance makes them highly cryptic. They somewhat resemble certain freshwater shrimp (Palaemonetes and Pseudopalaemon), as well as Priocharax characins, and they sometimes group together. Microphilypnus feed on tiny invertebrates.

== Species ==
The recognized species in this genus are:

- Microphilypnus acangaquara Caires & J. L. de Figueiredo, 2011
- Microphilypnus amazonicus G. S. Myers, 1927
- Microphilypnus macrostoma G. S. Myers, 1927
- Microphilypnus tapajosensis Caires, 2013
- Microphilypnus ternetzi G. S. Myers, 1927
