= Leptophilypnion =

Scientific classification
- Kingdom: Animalia
- Phylum: Chordata
- Class: Actinopterygii
- Order: Gobiiformes
- Family: Eleotridae
- Genus: Leptophilypnion; T. R. Roberts, 2013

Type species
- Leptophilypnion pusillus T. R. Roberts, 2013

Genus of fishes

Leptophilypnion is a genus of tiny fishes in the family Eleotridae endemic to the Amazon Basin in South America. At less than 1 cm (0.4 in) in standard length they are the smallest sleeper gobies and among the smallest fish. The larger Microphilypnus sleeper gobies are also found in the Amazon, and sometimes occur together with Leptophilypnion. The bottom-dwelling Leptophilypnion are typically found in shallow, stagnant or slow-flowing water among soft debris, leaf-litter or water plants.

== Species ==
The recognized species in this genus are:

- Leptophilypnion fittkaui T. R. Roberts, 2013
- Leptophilypnion pusillus T. R. Roberts, 2013
