= List of smallest fish =

The world's smallest fish depends on the measurement used.

Based on minimum standard length at maturity the main contenders are Paedocypris progenetica where females can reach it at 7.9 mm (0.31 in), the stout infantfish (Schindleria brevipinguis) where females reach it at 7 mm (0.28 in) and males at 6.5 mm (0.26 in), and Photocorynus spiniceps where males can reach it at 6.2 mm (0.24 in), but are attached to the far larger females. If judging smallest based on the species' maximum size (a measurement often used for fish), Paedocypris progenetica, dwarf pygmy goby (Pandaka pygmaea), midget dwarfgoby (Trimmatom nanus) and the stout infantfish (Schindleria brevipinguis) are not known to exceed 11 mm (0.43 in) in standard length, and the two Leptophilypnion sleeper gobies are less than 10 mm (0.39 in). A level of uncertainty about the full size range exists for some of these, as only a few specimens have been measured.

Little or no data is available on weight of most of these, but at less than 1 milligram (0.001 g) it is likely that the stout infantfish (Schindleria brevipinguis) is the smallest if using this feature.

== List of smallest fish in the world ==
Image	Common name	Species	Family	Standard length of smallest known mature individual	Maximum known standard length
	Dwarf goby	Paedocypris progenetica	Cyprinidae	7.9 mm (0.31 in), female	10.3 mm (0.41 in)
		Danionella translucida	Cyprinidae	10 mm	15 mm
		Danionella cerebrum	Cyprinidae	10 mm	12.6 mm
		Leptophilypnion fittkaui	Eleotridae	?	9.5 mm (0.37 in)
		Leptophilypnion pusillus	Eleotridae	?	9.1 mm (0.36 in)
	Dwarf pygmy goby	Pandaka pygmaea	Gobiidae	9 mm (0.35 in), male	11 mm (0.43 in)
	Midget dwarfgoby	Trimmatom nanus	Gobiidae	10 mm (0.39 in)	10 mm (0.39 in)
		Photocorynus spiniceps	Linophrynidae	6.2 mm (0.24 in), male	50.2 mm (1.98 in), female far larger than male and species not among smallest by maximum standard length
	Stout infantfish	Schindleria brevipinguis	Gobiidae	6.5 mm (0.26 in), male	10 mm (0.39 in)
		Hyaloglanis pulex	Trichomycteridae	10 mm (0.39 in)	14.9 mm (0.59 in)

== See also ==
- List of largest fish
- Smallest organisms
