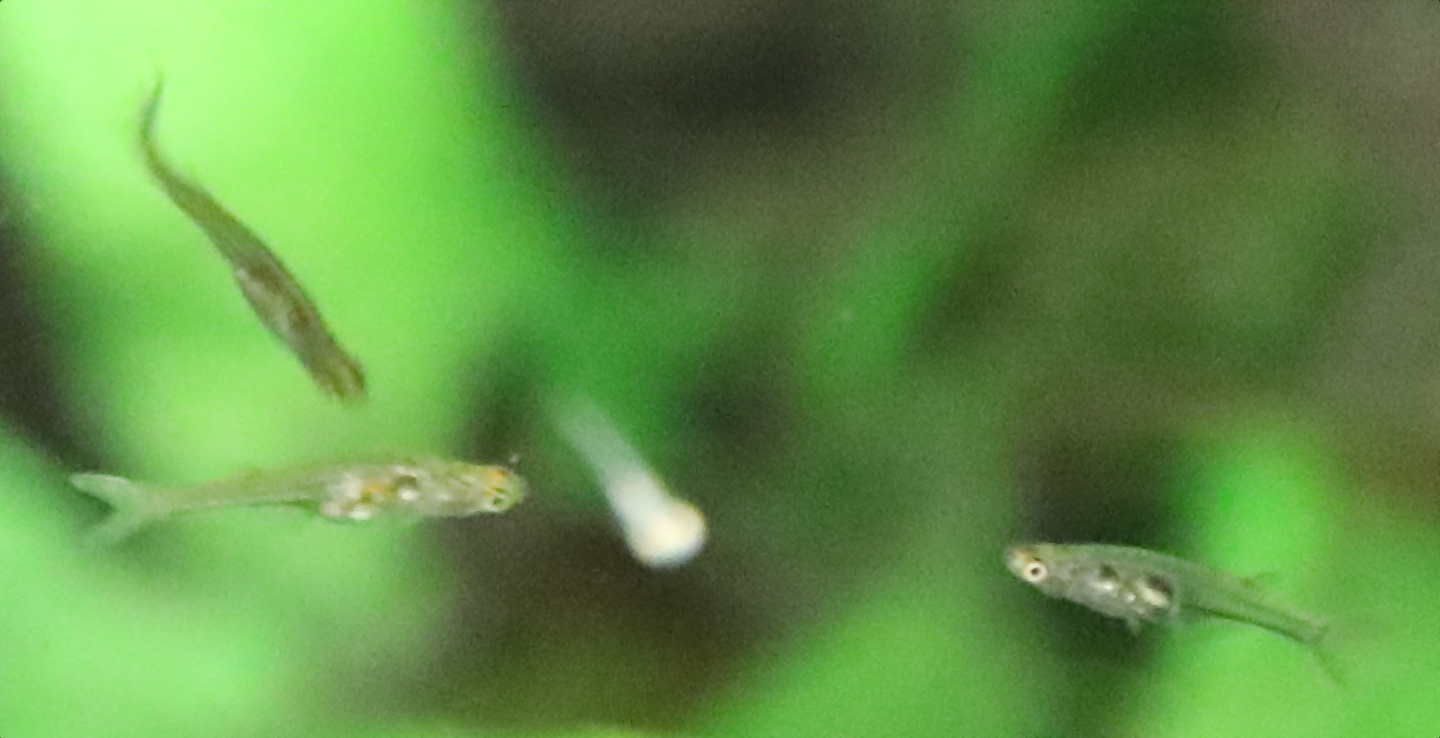
- At Bolton Aquarium

Conservation status
- Least Concern (IUCN 3.1)

Scientific classification
- Kingdom: Animalia
- Phylum: Chordata
- Class: Actinopterygii
- Order: Cypriniformes
- Family: Danionidae
- Subfamily: Danioninae
- Genus: Danionella
- Species: D. translucida

Binomial name
- Danionella translucida T. R. Roberts, 1986

= Danionella translucida =

Species of fish

Danionella translucida is an extremely small (1.1 cm long) species of freshwater ray-finned fish belonging to the family Danionidae. This fish is endemic to Myanmar. When described, it was considered to be one of the smallest fish. It was collected from the roots of floating aquatic plants in a slow-flowing, shallow stream (maximum depth 1 m) in the Pegu Division of Myanmar. It was found alongside Danio, Microrasbora, Erethistes, and Oryzias species. Observed in life, D. translucida is almost perfectly transparent except for its eyes. It has a distinctive pattern of melanophores. There are no melanophores on the dorsal surface except on the head over the posterior part of the brain. On the posterior half of the body, there a few melanophores following the horizontal midline. The sides and underside of the abdomen have melanophores. A double row of melanophores is present on the underside of the fish from the isthmus of the gills to the pelvic fins. Eggs in D. translucida has been found to range in size from about 0.3–0.6 mm (0.012–0.024 in) in diameter, with ripe eggs being at least 0.5 mm (0.020 in) in diameter. Females carried anywhere from 3 to 8 or 10 eggs. Compared to the body of the fish, these eggs are relatively large.

A scientific advantage of an optically transparent organism such as Danionella is that they allow neural activity recordings (typically calcium imaging) to be performed in the same animal that will later be used for neural circuit reconstruction. This allows researchers to bypass many of the animal-to-animal variability problems caused when trying to correlate the behavior observed in one animal with the reconstructed circuitry of a different animal.

Danionella has some advantages over another widely used transparent model organism, the larval zebrafish. Since the adult is transparent, not just the larva, a wider variety of behaviors can be studied. Furthermore, the animal is no longer developing, so there are fewer differences between the animal when it was trained, and when it was reconstructed.
