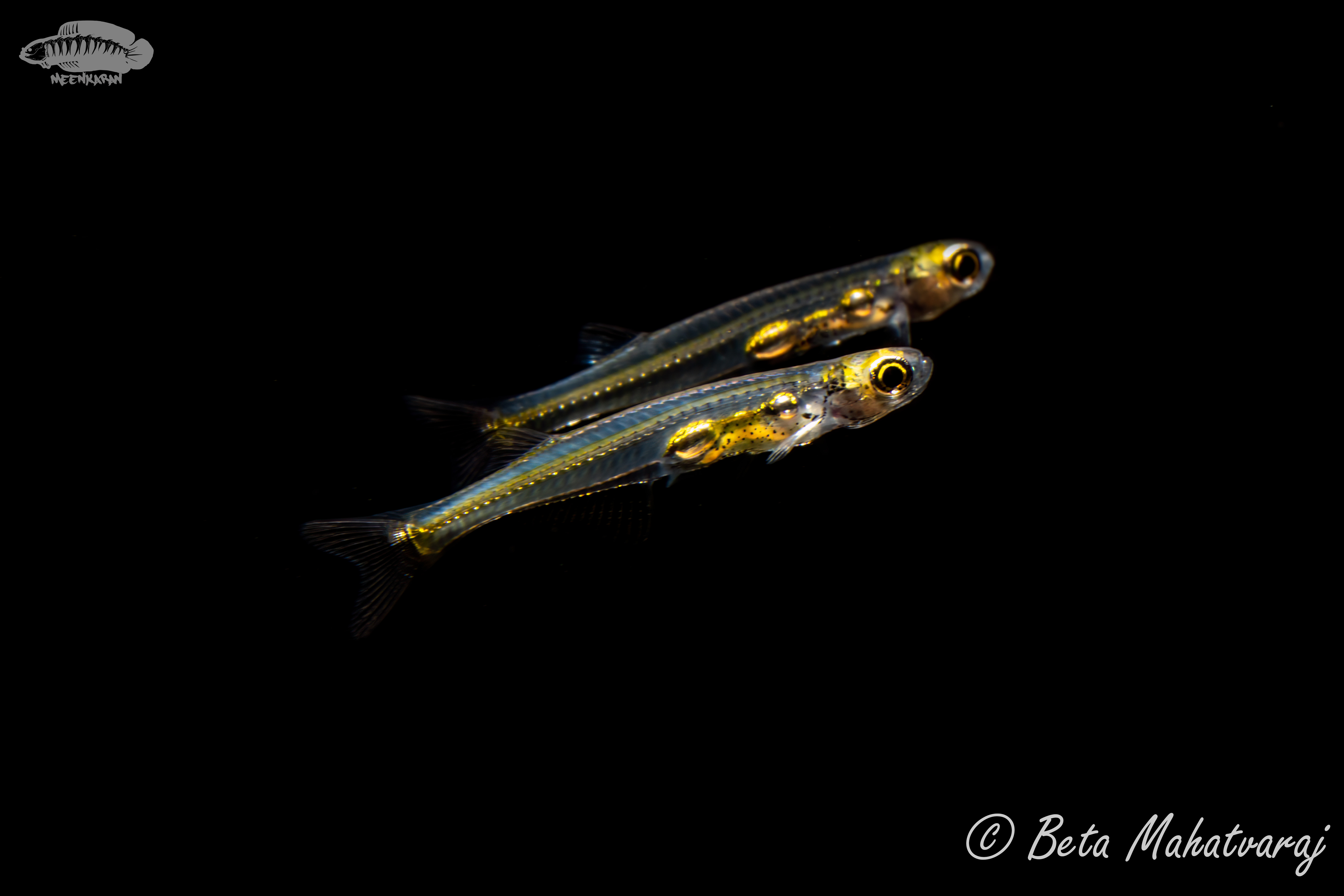

Conservation status
- Data Deficient (IUCN 3.1)

Scientific classification
- Domain: Eukaryota
- Kingdom: Animalia
- Phylum: Chordata
- Class: Actinopterygii
- Order: Cypriniformes
- Family: Danionidae
- Genus: Danionella
- Species: D. priapus

Binomial name
- Danionella priapus Britz, 2009

= Danionella priapus =

Species of fish

Danionella priapus is a species of Danionella endemic to India. It is sexually dimorphic and, like other species in the genus, possesses a skeleton with fewer bones than the closely related zebrafish. However, it has a number of distinguishing features which differentiate it from others in the genus, with the most notable example being the conically projecting genital papilla between the funnel-shaped pelvic fins of males.
