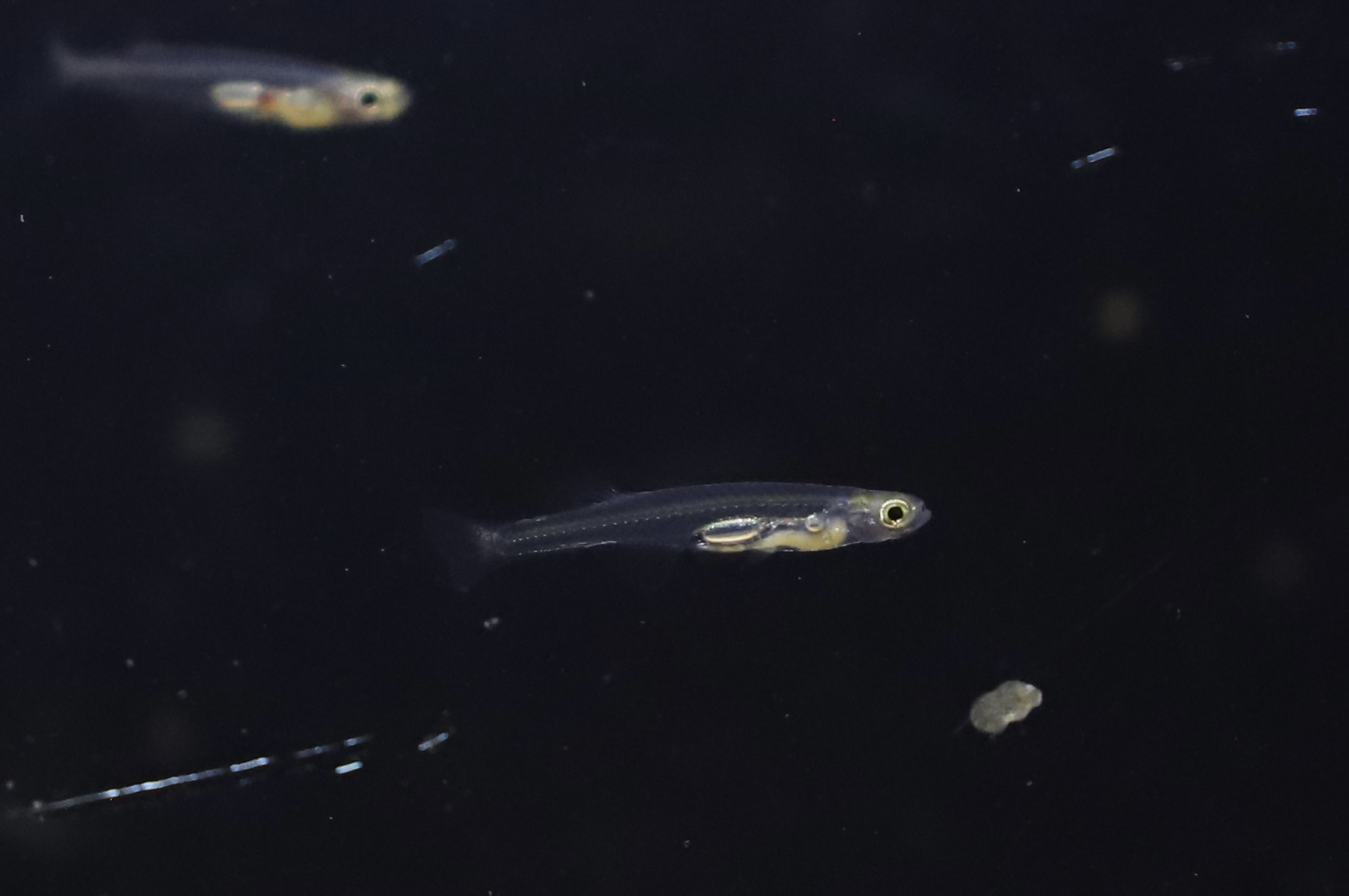
- Danionella Dracula

Conservation status
- Data Deficient (IUCN 3.1)

Scientific classification
- Kingdom: Animalia
- Phylum: Chordata
- Class: Actinopterygii
- Order: Cypriniformes
- Family: Danionidae
- Subfamily: Danioninae
- Genus: Danionella
- Species: D. dracula

Binomial name
- Danionella dracula Britz, Conway & Rüber, 2009

= Dracula fish =

Species of fish

The dracula fish (Danionella dracula) is a species of freshwater ray-finned fish belonging to the family Danionidae. It is a freshwater fish endemic to Myanmar. A close relative is Danio rerio, the zebrafish of aquariums. It is named dracula after its unusual "fangs"; male dracula fish have protruding tooth-like bones stemming from their jawbones. Males have been observed using their fangs to spar with other males.

Identified in April 2007 from specimens shipped to the United Kingdom in a consignment of aquarium fishes, the dracula fish has so far only been found in the wild in a small stream at Sha Du Zup between Mogaung and Tanai in northern Myanmar. It is a colourless miniature species and grows to a maximum size of around 17 millimetres (0.67 in). The fish has an elongate body with a large head and eyes. Dracula fish lack scales and the upper body is dominated by the jaws on large males. Much of the fish's structure is cartilaginous: it has 44 fewer bones than the zebrafish, and thus it is translucent and appears similar to larval forms. The natural diet of the dracula fish is unknown but in captivity it eats shrimp larvae, small nematodes and fish flakes. Close relatives of the fish feed upon small crustaceans and invertebrates.

The dracula fish is unusual in that its ancestors lost their true teeth around 50 million years ago, but re-evolved its bone fangs as a replacement around 30 million years ago. The species is sexually dimorphic in that the female does not have such prominent bone fangs. It becomes sexually mature while its body is still not fully developed; scientists speculate that this may happen because younger fish were more successful reproductively. Ichthyologist Dr Ralf Britz, who named the fish after Bram Stoker's character Count Dracula, stated that the dracula fish "is one of the most extraordinary vertebrates discovered in the last few decades."
