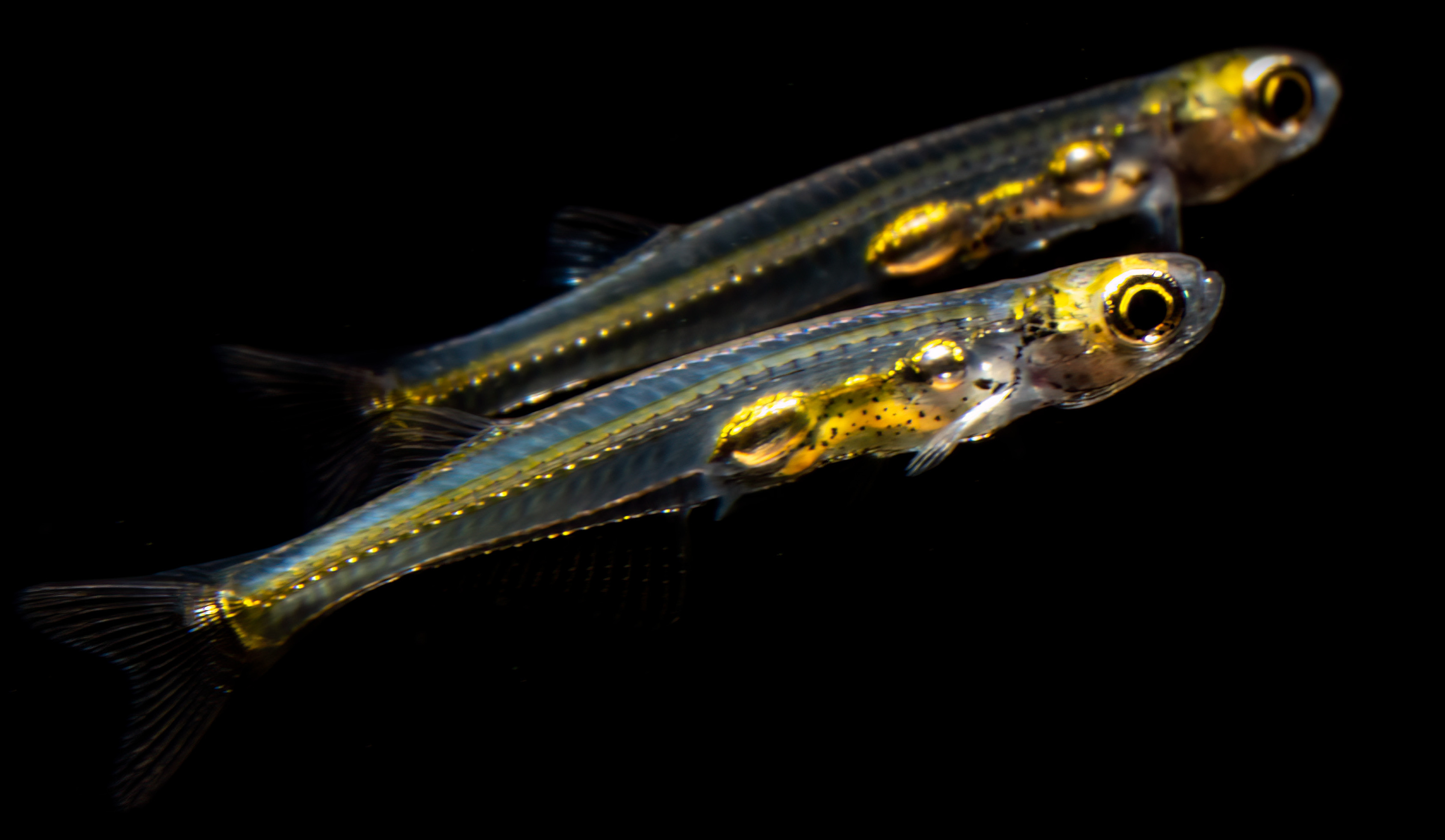
- Danionella priapus

Scientific classification
- Kingdom: Animalia
- Phylum: Chordata
- Class: Actinopterygii
- Division: Teleostei
- Order: Cypriniformes
- Family: Danionidae
- Subfamily: Danioninae
- Genus: Danionella; T. R. Roberts, 1986

Type species
- Danionella translucida T. R. Roberts, 1986

Species
- See text

= Danionella =

Genus of fishes

Danionella is a genus of danionin fishes found in temperate and subtropical freshwaters of the Bengal region and Myanmar under the suborder Cyprinoidei, colloquially termed as micro glassfish. It includes some of the smallest fishes as well as the smallest known vertebrates.

== Distribution ==
Four out of five described species of Danionella are found in Myanmar. D. translucida is described from the Ayeyarwady River basin, and D. mirifica was described from the Kamaing area in upper Myanmar. Danionella priapus is endemic to India.

== Description ==
When first described, Danionella translucida was the smallest ostariophysan and the smallest adult vertebrate to inhabit fresh water. Its adult size ranges from 10–12 millimetres (.43–.47 in) SL. D. mirifica gets slightly larger, at about 14 mm (.55 in) SL, but is still one of the smallest freshwater fishes.

Danionella species lack scales and barbels, but possess a lateral line.

D. mirifica has a single row of melanophores between the pelvic fins and the tips of the cleithra, and there is a lack of melanophores on the underside of the abdomen.

D. dracula reaches 17 mm in length. It is neotonous, lacking 44 bones that develop late in the related zebrafish Danio rerio. They have teeth made of bone, rather than the true teeth of other fishes, and the males have a pair of boney fangs which may be used during male-male competitions over nesting sites. Britz et al. believe the lineage lost true teeth about 50 Ma.

== As a model organism ==
Danionella is used in scientific experiments as it is small, optically transparent throughout its lifespan, genetically amenable and has a short generation time.

A particular scientific advantage of an optically transparent organism is that it allows neural activity recordings (typically calcium imaging) to be performed in the same animal that will later be used for neural circuit reconstruction. This allows researchers to bypass many of the animal-to-animal variability problems caused when trying to correlate the behavior observed in one animal with the reconstructed circuitry of a different animal.

== Species ==
Species	Common name	Image
Danionella cerebrum Britz, Conway & Rüber, 2021	Cerebrum micro glassfish	
Danionella dracula Britz, Conway & Rüber, 2009	Dracula glassfish	
Danionella mirifica Britz, 2003		
Danionella priapus Britz, 2009		
Danionella translucida T. R. Roberts, 1986	Translucent micro glassfish	
