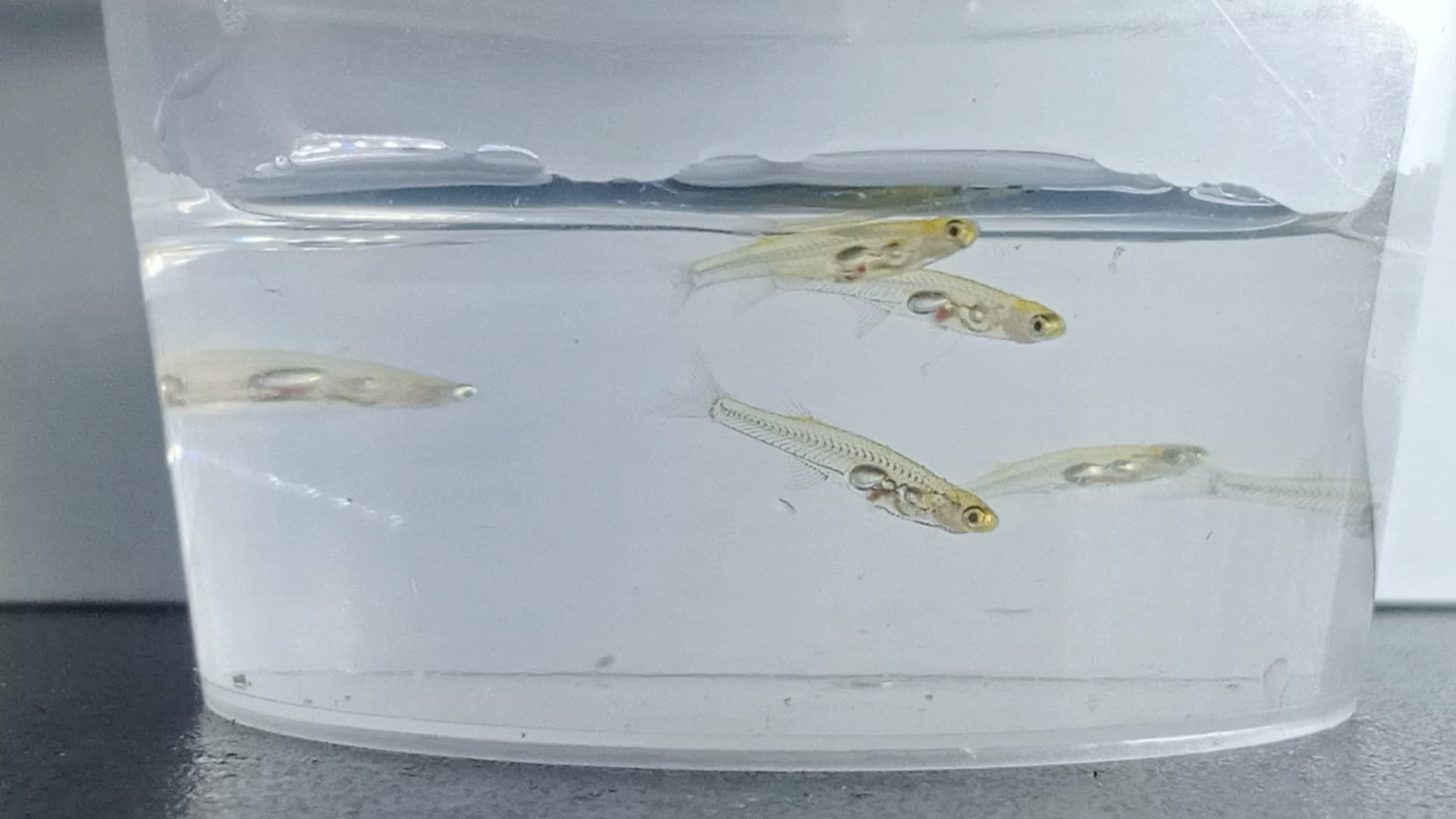

Scientific classification
- Kingdom: Animalia
- Phylum: Chordata
- Class: Actinopterygii
- Division: Teleostei
- Order: Cypriniformes
- Family: Danionidae
- Genus: Danionella
- Species: D. cerebrum

Binomial name
- Danionella cerebrum Britz, Conway & Rüber, 2021

= Danionella cerebrum =

New fish species identified from Myanmar

Danionella cerebrum is a species of miniature freshwater ray-finned fish in the family Danionidae, endemic to streams of the Bago Yoma range in Myanmar. It was described in 2021 by the ichthyologists Ralf Britz, Kevin W. Conway, and Lukas Rüber, who showed that the Danionella introduced as a neuroscience model in 2018 under the name Danionella translucida was an undescribed species.

Like other members of its genus, D. cerebrum matures at a very small size, up to 13.5 mm (0.53 in) in standard length, and keeps a larval-like skeleton and a largely translucent body into adulthood. The adult lacks a bony skull roof, leaving its brain covered only by skin. Together with its small brain size, this makes the brain unusually accessible to optical microscopy and techniques such as calcium imaging. Whereas the zebrafish, a more established fish model, is transparent mainly as a larva, D. cerebrum allows brain activity to be imaged in adults performing complex behaviors such as schooling. These traits, together with its relatively close relationship to the well-studied zebrafish, have made D. cerebrum an emerging model organism in neuroscience.

== Species description ==
The adult Danionella cerebrum ranges from 10-13.5 millimeters in length, with 13.5mm being the maximum size recorded. These measurements are based on ten specimens examined. The brain volume of this species is 0.6 mm3. In addition, the bodies of Danionella cerebrum are optically translucent, making it so most of their internal organs are visible directly through their skin even into adulthood. This unique characteristic allows researchers to have the ability to directly observe internal structures of this fish, such as the brain, heart, and swim bladder, without needing to do a dissection.

Danionella cerebrum has an elongated body with a short dorsal fin. The dorsal fin is positioned opposite to the posterior half of the long anal fin. This species has a large head, large eyes, well-developed nostrils, and a supraterminal mouth, also known as a superior mouth. A supraterminal mouth is an upturned mouth where the lower jaw is longer than the upper jaw. The lateral line canals and pores on the head and body of this fish are absent as well.

One particular identifier that separates this species from other Danionella species is the number of anal-fin rays. Danionella cerebrum has 15-18 anal-fin rays, whereas D. dracula possesses 12-14, D. translucida possesses 12-15, and D. priapus possesses 20-21 anal-fin rays. Not only is this species different in its number of anal ray fins, but this species is also unique in this genus in that it possesses 6 pectoral ray fins versus the 8 in D. priapus and 7 in D. dracula. In addition, another note on morphological distinctions of this species can be made by examining the number of vertebrae present, as D. cerebrum has 33-35 vertebrae, whereas other species of Danionella (D. mirifica, D. dracula, and D. priapus) have 36-38 vertebrae.

== Sexual dimorphism ==
In terms of the sexual dimorphism of this species, their coloration is translucent and lacks an overall body color. However, they do exhibit a yellow coloration that covers the dorsal side of their skull. This coloration is caused by chromatophores, which are irregularly scattered on the top and sides of the head and are also in a row going back behind the shoulder. On the other hand, females of this species exhibit a slightly darker coloration, as females with eggs have large melanophores containing darker pigments that line their abdominal wall and make the eggs quite visible to the outside observer from within the body cavity.

This species also exhibits well-developed Weberian ossicles, a series of bones that connect the swim bladder to the inner ear, and one such bone in this series, the os suspensorium, exhibits a strong sexual dimorphism between the sexes of this species. This os suspensorium, which is essentially the outer and inner arms that cover the roof of their swimbladders, is much more robust and developed in males. Males also have a drumming cartilage that is correlated with their swim bladder and their 5th rib. The cartilage is well ossified in males, but is weak and poorly ossified in females. All of these characteristics that males of this species possess and females lack lead to males having the ability to generate sounds capable of exceeding 140 decibels, which is comparable to a jet engine, causing immediate damage to human hearing. This behavior is not observed in the females of this species. This loud burst of sound in males of this species is believed to be a factor in roles including but not limited to social communication and aggression in interactions between males.

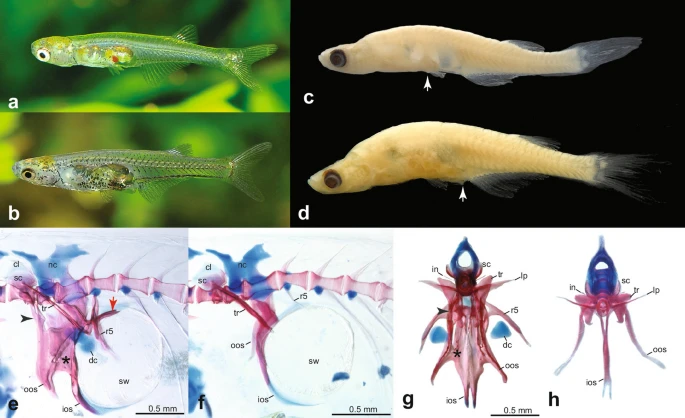
Danionella cerebrum male and female and skeletal structure comparison.

=== Figure 1. ===
Male (a) and Female (b) Danionella cerebrum. Male (10mm) and female (12mm) are shown live. Live specimens have translucent bodies with yellow chromatophores on the top of their head. Females possess large melanophores that line the abdominal wall and make the internal eggs visible externally. (e-h) Exhibit the differences in skeletal structure between the male (e and g) and the female (f and h), showing a more robust Weberian apparatus and the presence of drumming cartilage in males and the lack or weaker structures of those in females of this species.

== Geographic distribution ==
Danionella cerebrum is distributed across a number of streams on both the southern and eastern slopes of the Bago Yoma mountain range of Myanmar. More specifically, these streams include Tandabin Chaung and Bala Chaung, located in the Yangon Division, and an unnamed stream northwest of Daikme Chaung in the Bago Division of Myanmar. The streams in which they are found are all relatively turbid, low-altitude freshwater streams and roadside canals near the town of Hmawbi. In addition, this species, D. cerebrum, was found to overlap with and co-occur with a close relative, D. translucida, at Hmawbi.

== Habitat ==
In terms of the habitat conditions within these streams and roadside irrigation canals, all possessed shared characteristics such as visible flow, surface temperatures of around 30 degrees Celsius, a pH ranging from 7.4-7.5, and soft water of 20-100 micro Siemens. In terms of where the fish was found inhabiting within the water column, D. cerebrum was found at a depth below 30 centimeters rather than at the water's surface, and so the water was significantly cooler at this depth, at 25 degrees Celsius.

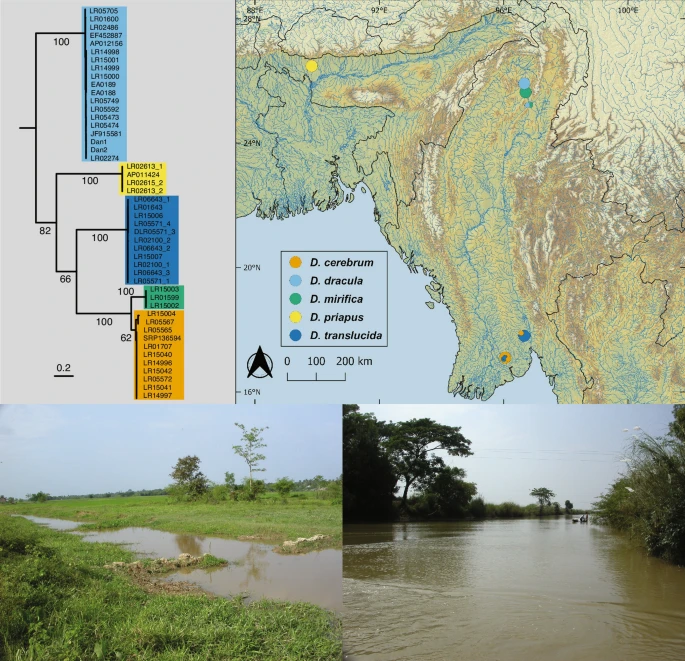
Danionella cerebrum habitat, Danionella distribution and gene tree.

=== Figure 2. ===
(Upper left) shows a tree of genes of the five species of Danionella. (Upper right) shows a distribution sampling map. Note: D. cerebrum and D. translucida have some overlap. (Lower left) Hmawbi roadside canal (Lower right) Daikme Chaung

== Biology ==
Similar to other species of this genus, Danionella, D. cerebrum also exhibits extreme progenesis in which the adult fish retains juvenile or larval-like features. This is most easily recognized in their morphology, in their lack of scales, and more simplified skeletal structure. More specifically, Danionella lacks 60 skeletal elements in its adult skeleton that would have been present if not for this extreme progenesis. One of these bones in particular that makes this species so unique is the lack of the roof bone of their skull, and this, along with other characteristics of this fish, allows for it to be a prime model organism to be used in answering neurophysiological questions by deep imaging the activity of their brain.

== Life history ==
Danionella cerebrum reaches sexual maturity at around 6 to 8 weeks of age. Females of this species produce small clutches of roughly 12 eggs per spawning event. In terms of the developmental and life history stages of this species, at about 4 weeks following hatching, the young fish begins in the formation of the sound-producing apparatus, which consists of modified bones and drumming cartilage that is associated with the swim bladder of the fish. This process occurs prior to the fish reaching full sexual maturity. After the initial formation of this sound-producing structure, the acoustic signalling of D. cerebrum undergoes quite notable changes as the fish ages, changes which are significant for both the intraspecific communication of the species as well as for their reproductive behavior. D. cerebrum start producing clicks once they are two months of age, and for the next one to two months to follow these clicks are observed to increase in both abundance and in quality through more structured repetition. Though the clicks of these fish increase in amplitude as the fish matures, the click repetition rate is not observed to increase; rather, this rate stays relatively stable throughout the development of the fish at 60 and 120 Hz.

== Behavior ==
D. cerebrum is pretty closely related to the zebrafish (Danio rerio) evolutionarily and shares a similar neuronal circuitry. Despite their similar brain structure, the two species have vastly different navigation strategies. Rather than swimming in short bursts as the zebrafish does, D. cerebrum swims in slower, smoother, and more continuous and longer movements. This key difference in swimming movements and patterns is thought to be likely due to the differences in the neural control of their locomotion. This is because D. cerebrum possesses midbrain neurons that are functionally different from those of the zebrafish, and those MLMNs (midbrain neurons associated with swimming activity) are what drive this difference in locomotion and ultimately the behavior of this species.

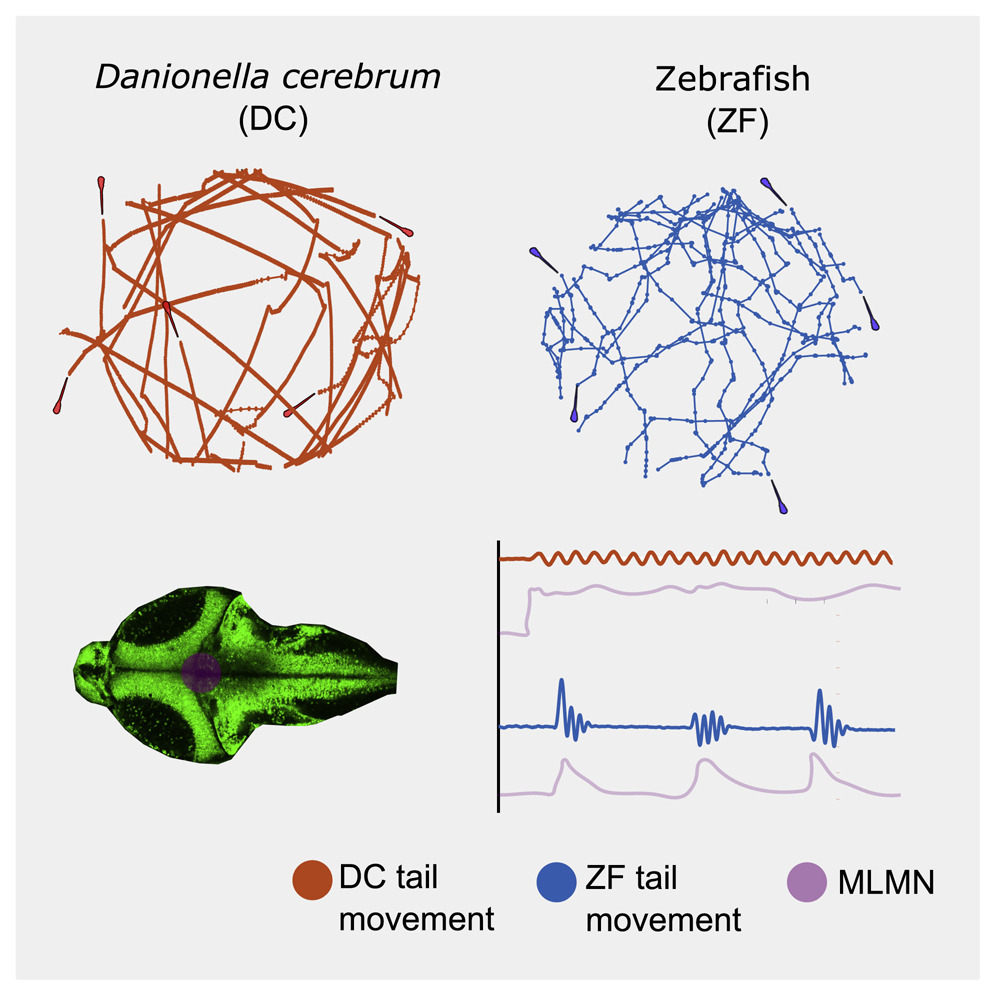
Swimming patterns comparing Danionella cerebrum to zebrafish.

=== Figure 3. ===
Shows the differences in swimming patterns between the Danionella cerebrum and the closely related zebrafish, along with an illustrated difference in the activity of MLMN neurons.

== Conservation status ==
The Danionella cerebrum is not listed as endangered. However, under the IUCN, it has not yet been evaluated. Despite this, this species does indeed face potential threats due to habitat degradation, as the streams and roadside canals this species is dependent on are subject to a plethora of anthropogenic factors, including but not limited to threats from urbanization, pollution, and climate change.
