= Lamina (neuropil) =

The lamina is the most peripheral neuropil of the insect visual system. There are twelve distinct neuron classes in the lamina: the lamina monopolar cells L1-L5, two GABAergic feedback neurons (C2 and C3), two wide-field feedback neurons (Lawf1 and Lawf2), lamina intrinsic amacrine neurons (Lai) and the T1 basket cell. The outer photoreceptors, R1-R6, terminate in the lamina, where they form tetrad synapses with L1, L2, L3, and Lai.

The lamina was the first portion of the nervous system of Drosophila to be reconstructed, thus starting the field of Drosophila connectomics. However the methods used were largely manual and further progress awaited more automated techniques.
