= Neural circuit reconstruction =

Neural circuit reconstruction is the reconstruction of the detailed circuitry of the nervous system (or a portion of the nervous system) of an animal. It is sometimes called EM reconstruction since the main method used is the electron microscope (EM). This field is a close relative of reverse engineering of human-made devices, and is part of the field of connectomics, which in turn is a sub-field of neuroanatomy.

== Model systems ==
Some of the model systems that have been used for circuit reconstruction are the nematode C. elegans, fruit fly, the mouse, and the human. C. elegans and the fruit fly have the advantage that their nervous systems are small enough to be reconstructed in their entirety, plus the organisms are well studied in other domains, such as genetics and behavior. The mouse and the human are vertebrates and mammals, with larger and more capable nervous systems, but their brains are much too large to reconstruct completely as as of 2025.

More recent model organisms include the larval zebrafish and Danionella cerebrum. These creatures have the advantage of being optically transparent, which allows neural activity recordings (typically calcium imaging) to be performed in the same animal that will later be reconstructed. This allows researchers to bypass many of the animal-to-animal variability problems caused in trying to correlate the behavior observed in one animal with the reconstructed circuitry of a different animal.

== Sample preparation ==
For electron microscopy, the sample must be fixed, stained, and embedded in plastic. Experimental optical expansion techniques such as LICONN require embedding in a transparent gel, and use antibodies for labelling.

== Imaging ==
For EM imaging, the sample may be cut into thin slices with a microtome, then imaged using transmission electron microscopy. This method is commonly referred to as ssTEM, for Serial Section Transmission Electron Microscopy.

Alternatively, the sample may be imaged with a scanning electron microscope, then the surface abraded using a focused ion beam (referred to as FIB-SEM), or trimmed using an in-microscope microtome. Then the sample is re-imaged, and the process repeated until the desired volume is processed.

If the LICONN technique above is used, the sample is imaged using a confocal microscope or by the use of light sheet fluorescence microscopy.

== Image processing ==
The first step is to align the individual images into a coherent three dimensional volume.

The volume is then annotated using one of two main methods. The first manually identifies the skeletons of each neurite. The second techniques uses computer vision software to identify voxels belonging to the same neuron. The second technique uses Machine Learning software to identify voxels belonging to the same neuron. Popular approaches are U-Net architectures to predict voxel-wise affinities paired with a watershed segmentation and flood-filling networks. These approaches produce an over-segmentation which can be manually or automatically agglomerated to correctly represent a neuron. Even for automatically agglomerated segmentations, large manual proofreading efforts are employed for highest accuracy.

Next, synapses within the volume are detected using machine learning techniques. Additional analysis, also using machine learning, is often employed to predict the neurotransmitter type of each synapse.

== Notable examples ==
- The connectome of C. elegans was the seminal work in this field. This circuit was obtained with great effort using manually cut sections and purely manual annotation on photographic film. For many years this was the only circuit reconstruction available.
- The central nervous system (both the brain and its connected ventral nerve cord) of the fruit fly Drosophila Melanogaster have been reconstructed for both male and female flies. These data releases include on-line tools to query the connectome.
- The Human Cortex H01, released in 2021, is a 1.4 petabyte volume of a small sample of human brain tissue imaged at nanoscale-resolution by serial section electron microscopy, reconstructed and annotated by automated computational techniques, and analyzed for preliminary insights into the structure of human cortex.
- In their 2022 study "Connectomic comparison of mouse and human cortex", the researchers reconstructed 9 connectomes across species: datasets of Mouse, Macaque and Human.

== Querying the connectome ==
Connectomes of higher organism's brains requires considerable data. For a recent reconstruction of the fruit fly ventral nerve cord, for example, roughly 86 terabytes of image data were processed, by humans and computers, to generate several gigabyte of connectome data. Easy interaction with this data requires an interactive query interface, where researchers can look at the portion of data they are interested in without downloading the whole data set, and without specific training. A specific example of this technology is the NeuPrint interface to the connectomes generate at HHMI. This mimics the infrastructure of genetics, where interactive query tools such as BLAST are normally used to look at genes of interest, which for most research comprise only a small portion of the genome.

== Limitations and future work ==
Understanding the detailed operation of the reconstructed networks also requires knowledge of gap junctions (hard to see with existing techniques), the identity of neurotransmitters and the locations and identities of receptors. In addition, neuromodulators can diffuse across large distances and still strongly affect function. Currently these features must be obtained through other techniques.

Expansion microscopy may provide an alternative to EM for circuit reconstruction. In 2024, a new technique called LICONN combined hydrogel expansion with light microscopy (as opposed to electron microscopy) to generate neuron level connectomes. Potential advantages include cheaper equipment, faster data acquisition, and multi-color labelling. The equipment is cheaper as a confocal microscope is less costly than an electron microscope. The data acquisition is faster since only a change of focus, not physical sectioning, is required. Multi-color labelling is helpful as some features such as gap junctions are hard to spot in electron microscopy, but are easily labelled by antibodies in optical images. By using antibody–oligonucleotide conjugates, and correspondingly labelled dyes, tens to hundreds of labels are likely feasible. These can aid in neurotransmitter identification and identification of other structures that are difficult to interpret in monochrome EM images.
