= Optic lobe (arthropods) =

The optic(al) lobe of arthropods is a structure of the protocerebrum that sits behind the arthropod eye (mostly compound eyes) and is responsible for the processing of the visual information. It is made up of three layers:

Lamina (ganglionaris)
responsible for contrast enhancement through lateral inhibition
Medulla
processes movement and shows movement direction sensitivity. Possesses local motion detectors
Lobula
integrates information from large areas of the visual field to abstract visual information and object recognition

Lobula plate
wide-field motion vision
