= Neuronal tracing =

Determination of neuron connections

In neuroscience, neuronal tracing or neuron reconstruction refers to the determination of the pathway of the neurites or neuronal processes, the axons and dendrites, of a neuron. In the overall framework of neural circuit tracing, tracing at the neuron level lies in the mesoscale and generally uses light microscopy, as opposed the macroscale (brain regions, commonly imagined via MRI) and the nanoscale (individual synaptic contacts, commonly imagined using electron microscopy). All three scales contribute to the generation of connectomes.

When using light microscopy, the main distinction among neuronal tracing techniques is the chemical or genetic labeling of a cell to help differentiate them from other cells. According to the direction a histochemical tracer moves in, one can differentiate anterograde tracing (labeling from the cell body to synapse) and retrograde tracing (from the synapse to cell body). The tracer can be a chemical or a genetic construct such as a viral tracer. A viral tracer may be static, which means that it stays within the injected cell, or trans-synpatic, which means that it crosses synaptic connections and goes on to label an entire group of connected cells. Chemical, static viral, and trans-synaptic viral tracers are all available in anterograde and retrograde forms. Some tracers are also bidirectional.

Although electron microscopy (EM) is mainly used for nanoscale tracing, it can also image cell bodies and provide a neuron-level map. This is done in the connectome reconstruction projects of Caenorhabditis elegans, Drosophila melanogaster, and Ciona intestinalis. All of these are from small animals because EM is slow and expensive: even after the technological breakthroughs of the 2010s, it still stakes 1.5 years to slice and image a single cubic millimeter of tissue. In larger animals, EM is well-suited to components of relatively small local circuits with well-understood inputs and outputs such as part of the retina.

Whether EM or light microscopy is used, neuronal tracing requires interpretation of image data. This used to be done manually, which is slow, laborious, and error-prone. The results could only be compared to a 2D reference atlas, which is often impossible when the tissue is cut in a different angle. Advances in computer vision as well as the development of 3D atlases have allowed scientists to analyze much more data much faster.

== History ==
The need to describe or reconstruct a neuron's morphology probably began in early days of neuroscience when neurons were labeled or visualized using Golgi's methods. Many of the known neuron types, such as pyramidal neurons and Chandelier cells, were described based on their morphological characterization.

The first computer-assisted neuron reconstruction system, now known as Neurolucida, was developed by Dr. Edmund Glaser and Dr. Hendrik Van der Loos in the 1960s.

Modern approaches to trace a neuron started when digitized pictures of neurons were acquired using microscopes. Initially this was done in 2D. Quickly after the advanced 3D imaging, especially the fluorescence imaging and electron microscopic imaging, there were a huge demand of tracing neuron morphology from these imaging data. To reconstruct 3D volumes of neurons, a popular method is serial section EM, in which the sample is sliced into thin layers and each slice is imaged, resulting in a voxel dataset.

Modern neuronal tracing effort have been completed on voxel volumes with a resolution of up to 4 × 4 × 34 nm^{3} and database sizes of over 1.4 petabytes.

== Digital neuronal reconstruction ==
Digital reconstruction or tracing of neuron morphology is a fundamental task in computational neuroscience. It is also critical for mapping neuronal circuits based on advanced microscope images, usually based on light microscopy (e.g. laser scanning microscopy, bright field imaging) or electron microscopy or other methods. Due to the high complexity of neuron morphology and often seen heavy noise in such images, as well as the typically encountered massive amount of image data, it has been widely viewed as one of the most challenging computational tasks for computational neuroscience. Many image analysis based methods have been proposed to trace neuron morphology, usually in 3D, manually, semi-automatically or completely automatically. There are normally three processing steps: generation and proof editing, and annotating of a reconstruction.

In computer vision, neuronal tracing is an example of the semantic image segmentation task.

== Methods ==
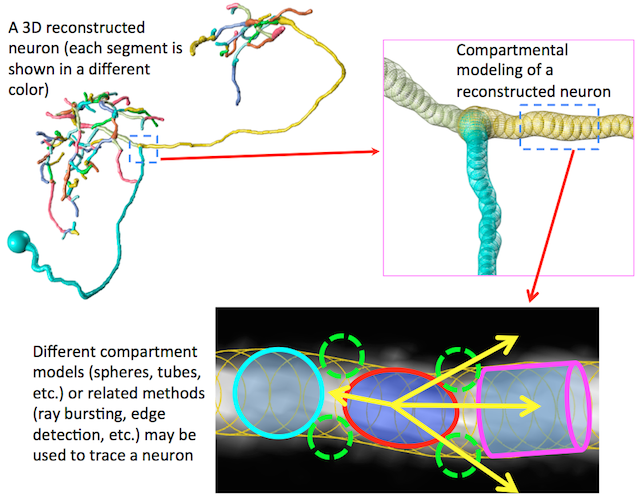
Schematic illustration of digital tracing of a neuron's morphology

Neurons can be often traced manually either in 2D or 3D. To do so, one may either directly paint the trajectory of neuronal processes in individual 2D sections of a 3D image volume and manage to connect them, or use the 3D Virtual Finger painting which directly converts any 2D painted trajectory in a projection image to real 3D neuron processes. The major limitation of manual tracing of neurons is the huge amount of labor in the work.

Automated reconstructions of neurons can be done using model (e.g. spheres or tubes) fitting and marching, pruning of over-reconstruction, minimal cost connection of key points, ray-bursting and many others. Skeletonization is a critical step in automated neuron reconstruction, but in the case of all-path-pruning and its variants it is combined with estimation of model parameters (e.g. tube diameters). The major limitation of automated tracing is the lack of precision especially when the neuron morphology is complicated or the image has substantial amount of noise. Newer methods also include the use of convolutional neural networks to segment, reconstruct, and annotate large datasets. These AI models are trained off of 'ground truth' provided by manual or semi-automatic reconstructions and have since achieved superhuman accuracy.

Semi-automated neuron tracing often depends on two strategies. One is to run the completely automated neuron tracing followed by manual curation of such reconstructions. The alternative way is to produce some prior knowledge, such as the termini locations of a neuron, with which a neuron can be more easily traced automatically. Semi-automated tracing is often thought to be a balanced solution that has acceptable time cost and reasonably good reconstruction accuracy. The open source software Vaa3D-Neuron, Neurolucida 360, Imaris Filament Tracer and Aivia all provide both categories of methods.

Tracing of electron microscopy image is thought to be more challenging than tracing light microscopy images, while the latter is still quite difficult, according to the DIADEM competition. For tracing electron microscopy data, manual tracing is used more often than the alternative automated or semi-automated methods. For tracing light microscopy data, more times the automated or semi-automated methods are used.

Since tracing electron microscopy images takes substantial amount time, collaborative manual tracing software is useful. Crowdsourcing is an alternative way to effectively collect collaborative manual reconstruction results for such image data sets, one example being Eyewire.

== Tools and software ==
A number of neuron tracing tools especially software packages are available. One comprehensive Open Source software package that contains implementation of a number of neuron tracing methods developed in different research groups as well as many neuron utilities functions such as quantitative measurement, parsing, comparison, is Vaa3D and its Vaa3D-Neuron modules. Some other free tools such as NeuronStudio also provide tracing function based on specific methods. Neuroscientists also use commercial tools such as Neurolucida, Neurolucida 360, Aivia, Amira, etc. to trace and analyse neurons. A 2012 study show that Neurolucida is cited over 7 times more than all other available neuron tracing programs combined, and is also the most widely used and versatile system to produce neuronal reconstruction. The BigNeuron project (https://alleninstitute.org/bigneuron/about/) is a recent substantial international collaboration effort to integrate the majority of known neuron tracing tools onto a common platform to facilitate Open Source, easy accessing of various tools at one single place. Powerful new tools such as UltraTracer, that can trace arbitrarily large image volume, have been produced through this effort. The online tool WEBKNOSSOS has a Flight Mode for high-speed tracing of axons or dendrites, in which trained annotator crowds achieve tracing speeds of 1.5 ± 0.6 mm/h for axons and 2.1 ± 0.9 mm/h for dendrites in 3D electron microscopy data.

== Neuron formats and databases ==
Reconstructions of single neurons can be stored in various formats. This largely depends on the software that have been used to trace such neurons. The SWC format, which consists of a number of topologically connected structural compartments (e.g. a single tube or sphere), is often used to store digital traced neurons, especially when the morphology lacks or does not need detailed 3D shape models for individual compartments. Other more sophisticated neuron formats have separate geometrical modeling of the neuron cell body and neuron processes using Neurolucida among others.

There are a few common single neuron reconstruction databases. A widely used database is http://NeuroMorpho.Org which contains over 86,000 neuron morphology of >40 species contributed worldwide by a number of research labs. Allen Institute for Brain Science, HHMI's Janelia Research Campus, and other institutes are also generating large-scale single neuron databases.

Recently, databases of entire reconstructed neural volumes have also been made available. The Max Planck Zebrafish Brain Atlas and its associated dataset are the reconstructed connectome of the 208 neurons of a zebrafish larva. The CATMAID database contains the traced connectome of a Platynereis larval connectome with 1,500 neurons and 6,500 non-neural cells. The Flywire connectome is a reconstruction and annotation of the approximately 140,000 annotated neurons making up the brain of an adult Drosophila. The H01 dataset is a reconstructed cubic millimeter of human brain tissue.

Many of related neuron data databases at different scales also exist.
