= Histochemical tracer =

A histochemical tracer is a substance used to reveal the location of cells and track neuronal projections. A neuronal tracer may be retrograde, anterograde, or work in both directions. A retrograde tracer is taken up in the terminal of the neuron and transported to the cell body, whereas an anterograde tracer moves away from the cell body of the neuron.

== List ==
Small molecules:

- DiI (DiC18(3)) - evenly bidirectional
- Diamidino yellow - evenly bidirectional
- Fast blue - evenly bidirectional
- Hydroxystilbamidine - retrograde
- Texas Red
- Fluorescein isothiocyanate

Biopolymers:

- Biotinylated dextran amine (BDA) - evenly bidirectional
- Horseradish peroxidase - retrograde
- Cholera toxin B (CtB) - retrograde and anterograde

Viral/other genetic constructs:

- Pseudorabies virus - retrograde
- HSV-1 - anterograde

The noted directionalities are also not always pure, especially in the case of CtB which is conventionally used retrograde, and BDA is conventionally used anterograde. Most non-genetic tracers can also be taken up by fibers of passage, causing mislabeling (this also applies to canine adenovirus). The spread of the non-genetic tracer around the injection site results in a diffuse and intense labeling.
