= Three-photon adaptive optics microscopy =

Fluorescence imaging technology

Three-photon adaptive optics microscopy (3PAOM) is a technology that implements adaptive optics to correct wavefront aberrations produced by three-photon microscopy. This technique allows for significantly improved performance when compared to traditional confocal microscopy (also known as single-photon microscopy) and two-photon microscopy.

== Concept ==
Three-photon excitation microscopy (3PEF) was first performed in 1964 by S. Singh and L. T. Bradley at the National Research Council in Ottawa, Canada. This technology was further advanced in 1996 by Stefan Hell and others, who demonstrated the possibility of applying three-photon excitation microscopy to scanning fluorescence microscopy, paving the way for later applications of 3PEF.

Adaptive optics was first theorized by American astronomer Horace W. Babcock in 1953, who surmised that it could be used to improve the quality of astronomical images. However, insufficient computational power was available at the time to make the technology practical, which came into widespread use only during the 1990s. While adaptive optics have found widespread use in astronomy and retinal imaging, their application in microscopy has been a more recent advancement as of 2017.

In three-photon excitation, the target fluorophore absorbs three photons of roughly one-third of the fluorophore's excitation energy almost simultaneously (all photons arrive within approximately 1 femtosecond of each other). This permits 3PEF to have useful depths significantly greater than other fluorescent imaging techniques, but greater imaging depths produce more significant wavefront aberrations. Adaptive optics can be used to correct these aberrations, thereby maintaining image clarity at greater penetration depths.

== Advantages ==
Adaptive optics-corrected three-photon microscopy has the potential to improve deep tissue imaging significantly. Three-photon microscopy has vastly improved penetration depth compared to two-photon microscopy, and thanks to the correction made by adaptive optics, image quality can be preserved even at high penetration depths. As a result, 3PEF also gives reduced degradation of the signal-to-background ratio with depth when compared with two-photon microscopy.

Three-photon microscopy is also more resistant to out-of-focus light and is less prone to causing photobleaching due to the lower per-photon energy than two-photon microscopy or confocal microscopy.

== Development ==
In the early 2010s, deep tissue imaging was first performed using three-photon fluorescence microscopy. In 2013, Nicholas G. Horton were able to image a mouse brain with an excitation window of 1700 nm. In 2017, Christopher J. Rowlands increased useful penetration depth significantly by employing wide-field three-photon excitation. While these advancements drastically improved penetration depth over two-photon microscopy, image resolution was limited by the aberrations introduced by travel through tissue.

In 2021, Lina Streich overcame this limitation by combining the effects of indirect adaptive optics with three-photon excitation to increase useful penetration depth up to 1.4 mm in a mouse brain. In 2022, David Sinefeld et al. further improved both resolution and penetration depth by applying adaptive optics techniques through a spatial light modulator. As of 2023, development is ongoing, with researchers investigating techniques of maintaining high resolution at even greater penetration depths.

== Wavefront Correction ==
In order to return the remove the aberration in the received wavefront, a wavefront correction is needed. Light from the tissue is incident upon a deformable mirror, which adjusts the wavefront through a feedback control system.

A three-point parabolic approximation is applied to optimize the phase. For each Zernike order, both negative and positive phase patterns are used ($+\alpha$ and $-\alpha$). The signals and are measured by the control system and taken with the original signal (to which no phase has been applied) to calculate the multiplication constant according to the three-point parabolic approximation equation. The correction weight can thus be calculated for three-photon microscopy:

$C_i=\frac{\alpha}{2}\frac{\sqrt[3]{S_{i+}}-\sqrt[3]{S_{i-}}}{-\sqrt[3]{S_{i+}}+\sqrt[3]{S_{i-}}-2\sqrt[3]{S_{i0}}}$

The current phase applied on the deformable mirror is added with the i^{th} Zernike pattern with the calculated correction weight. A full sequence of corrections is complete when there is no measurable improvement in the signal. Signal improvement can be quantified in a number of different ways, including total fluorescence signal, signal-to-noise ratio, and contrast.

== See also ==
- Two-photon excitation microscopy
