= Ann E. Kelley =

American neuroscientist

- Born: Milton, Massachusetts
- Died: Madison, Wisconsin
- Education: University of Pennsylvania; Trinity College, Cambridge
- Scientific career
- Fields: Neuroscience
- Workplaces: University of Wisconsin
- Doctoral advisor: Susan Iversen

Ann Elizabeth Kelley (1954–2007) was an American neuroscientist, who specialized in the neuroscience of reward and behavior. She was a professor at the University of Wisconsin.

== Biography ==
Kelley was born in Milton, Massachusetts. She became interested in neuroscience during a field trip to Harvard. She completed her undergraduate studies at the University of Pennsylvania, where she was captain for both the field hockey and lacrosse teams. She then received a Thouron fellowship which allowed her to pursue a PhD at the University of Cambridge, England, under the supervision of Susan Iversen. She was among the first 13 women to be admitted to Trinity College in 1976. At Cambridge she continued to play lacrosse, and she was a member of the rowing team. She continued her work at the Harvard Medical School with Walle Nauta. Later, she held research and teaching positions at the University of Bordeaux in France, Harvard University and Northeastern University, before settling at the University of Wisconsin, where she was named Wisconsin Distinguished Neuroscience Professor in 2006. At the University of Wisconsin, she was also Director of the Neuroscience Training Program. In 2006, she was honored with Mika Salpeter Lifetime Achievement Award by the Society for Neuroscience. She died from metastatic colon cancer on August 5, 2007 at her home in Madison, Wisconsin, at the age of 53.

Kelley was an accomplished athlete, being a pioneering player for the women's lacrosse team and the field hockey team at the University of Pennsylvania. She started a rowing eight at Cambridge and was stroke for the team. She competed in the May Bumps in a women's four. She was also an avid skier.

Kelley was the mother of three children.

== Research ==
Kelley's research focused on the neuroscience of reward and behavior. She was a leading expert in the intracerebral microinfusion technique.

During her PhD and the following years she studied the mesocorticostriatal systems and the role of opioids in interactions between the striatum and hypothalamic regulatory circuits in the control of behavior. Following these studies she focused on eating behavior and food intake. She found that eating behavior was mediated by μ-opioids, but this mechanism was dependent on the palatability of the food.

She later performed studies to determine what part of the striatum was responsible for this mechanism. Together with Min Zhang she performed a microinfusion study that showed that the ventral and lateral areas of the striatum, including both the shell and the core of the nucleus accumbens, were most sensitive to injections of opioids causing behavioural changes.

Together with Ned Kalin, Kelley demonstrated the role of the amygdala in the linking of sensory representations and their motivational value. After lesioning the amygdala in rhesus monkeys, they found that the monkeys no longer learn proper fear responses to stimuli, such as a predator.

During her time with Walle Nauta, she also performed anterograde and retrograde tracing studies to study the neural projections from the amygdala to the striatum. They showed that these projection were much more extensive than previously thought, and that the amygdala innervates large parts of the caudal striatum. As the amygdala is involved in motivation they speculated that the striatum may in fact also be mediated in a large part by motivation.

Kelly furthermore showed that food can act as an addictive substance. She found that the consumption of salty and sweet foods was influenced injection of a μ-opioid antagonist into the nucleus accumbens in a similar way the intake of alcohol, but not the intake of water, was.

== Legacy ==
Two years after her death, Kelley posthumously received the Patricia Goldman-Rakic Hall of Honor award by the Society for Neuroscience. The University of Wisconsin-Madison established the Ann E. Kelley Fellowship in Behavioral Science in her honour. Kelley's alma mater, the University of Pennsylvania, established the Ann E. Kelley Memorial Scholarship in 2007. In 2013 the journal Neuroscience & Biobehavioral Reviews dedicated a volume to her.
