= Sebastian Seung =

American multi-disciplinary scientist

H. Sebastian Seung
- Citizenship: American
- Education: Harvard University (B.A., PhD); Hebrew University of Jerusalem (PostDoc)
- Known for: Connectome theory Non-negative matrix factorization Corporate President of Samsung Electronics; Head of Samsung Research
- Children: 3 daughters
- Awards: Sloan Fellowship
- Scientific career
- Fields: Neuroscience physics
- Workplaces: Princeton University; MIT; Bell Labs
- Thesis: Physics of Lines and Surfaces (1990)
- Doctoral advisor: David Robert Nelson

Korean name
- Hangul: 승현준
- Hanja: 承現峻
- RR: Seung Hyeonjun
- MR: Sŭng Hyŏnjun
- Website: Official website

Hyunjune Sebastian Seung (English: /sung/ or [səŋ]; Korean: 승현준; Hanja: 承現峻) was president at Samsung Research (Samsung Electronics) and is an Anthony B. Evnin Professor in the Princeton Neuroscience Institute and Department of Computer Science. Seung has done influential research in both computer science and neuroscience. He has helped pioneer the new field of connectomics, "developing new computational technologies for mapping the connections between neurons," and has been described as the cartographer of the brain.

Since 2014, he has been a professor in computer science and neuroscience at Princeton University's Neuroscience Institute at the Jeff Bezos Center in Neural Dynamics, where he directs the Seung Labs. Before, he worked at the Massachusetts Institute of Technology as a full professor in computational neuroscience in the Department of Brain and Cognitive Sciences and as a professor in physics.

In the industry, he was a research scientist at the Bell Labs and an Investigator of the Howard Hughes Medical Institute. Since 2015, he has joined the board of advisors for Nara Logics, an MIT-based startup specializing in brain research and big data. Since 2018, he was hired as the Chief Research Scientist at Samsung.

He is most well known as a proponent of connectomics through his Ted talk "I am my Connectome" and his book Connectome which was named top 10 nonfiction books of the year 2012 by the Wall Street Journal and has been translated into dozens of languages.

He founded EyeWire, an online computer game that mobilizes social computing and machine learning on a mission to map the human brain. It has attracted hundreds of thousands of users from over a hundred countries, and it has recently partnered with KT Corporation to help spread the scientific mission and attract more players to the cause.

Seung is also known for his 1999 and 2000 joint works on non-negative matrix factorization, an important algorithm used in AI and data science.

== Biography ==
Seung was born in New York, NY. His father T. K. Seung/Thomas Seung/T.K. Swing was a philosophy professor at the University of Texas, Austin, and Korean-American immigrant who escaped North Korea as a teenager. Sebastian's mother is Kwihwan Hahn, a graduate of Juilliard, and he has two younger siblings, a brother, currently a professor at Harvard Medical School, and a sister, currently a psychiatrist.

By age five, he had taught himself how to read. Growing up, his passions were soccer, math, nonfiction (science and philosophy), and Greek myths. His interest in western philosophy and the classics appears in his books including Connectome. As a teenager, he was particularly inspired by Carl Sagan's Cosmos to become a physicist.

=== Education and physics career (1982–2005) ===
He studied theoretical physics as an undergraduate at Harvard University (enrolled 1982 when 16 years old), taking graduate courses as a sophomore when he was 17 years old (he skipped a few grades in elementary school). He then went straight into Harvard's graduate program and obtained his Ph.D. in 1990 under the supervision of David Robert Nelson.

Seung's 1990 doctoral dissertation is titled "Physics of Lines and Surfaces." It examines the statistical mechanics of vortex lines in high-temperature superconductors and uses tools such as the renormalization group perturbation theory. It then uses Monte Carlo simulations to analyze buckling phase transition behavior and critical phenomena, drawing comparisons with the Ising model and XY spin-glass model. Finally it introduces a continuum elastic theory for certain hexatic molecules.

During his Ph.D. studies he briefly interned at the Bell Labs in 1989. There he was introduced to the mathematical problem of neural networks.

He completed his postdoctoral training at the Hebrew University of Jerusalem. He returned to the Bell Labs and was a member of the Theoretical Physics Department. In 2004, he joined the MIT faculty first as a professor in physics and then as a professor in neuroscience.

=== Switch to neuroscience and connectomics ===
It was near the end of 2005 when he made the switch from physics to neuroscience, which at the time was considered a risky career move. In November, one of his former mentors David Tank from the Bell Labs suggested a new problem to Seung: how does the brain work? He was invited to a neuroscience conference in Germany, and in January 2006 he brought two of his graduate students to learn about a new technology that imaged the brain in higher resolution built by Winfried Denk. It was then that Seung worked day and night writing grant proposals to fund computational research in connectomics, which at the time was seen as a "highly speculative engineering project."

Since 2014, Seung joined the faculty at Princeton as a professor in neuroscience at the Bezos Center for Neural Circuit Dynamics. Seung now leads a team working on an online citizen science project, EyeWire. It is human-based computation game about tracing neurons in the retina. The game was developed by MIT and the Max Planck Institute for Medical Research.

== The Connectome Theory ==
The connectome is the map of the 100 trillion plus neural connections within the brain. Its name is based on the same way the genome is a map of a species' DNA. In simplest mathematical terms, it can be thought of as a graph network. Seung focuses on the potential implications of the Human Connectome Project and what it would mean to map the connectome of a human brain. He has popularized the connectome theory through his 2010 TED Conference speech titled “I Am My Connectome” as well as through his 2012 book Connectome: How the Brain’s Wiring Makes Us Who We Are.

He proposes that every memory, skill, and passion is encoded somehow in the connectome. And when the brain is not wired properly it can result in mental disorders such as autism, schizophrenia, Alzheimer's, and Parkinson's. Understanding the human connectome may not only help cure such diseases with treatments but also possibly help doctors prevent them from occurring in the first place. And if we can represent the sum of all human experiences and memories in the connectome, then we can download human brains on to flash drives, save them indefinitely, and replay those memories in the future, thereby granting humans a kind of immortality.

=== TED Talk: "I Am My Connectome" ===
In his 2010 TED Conference speech, Seung hypothesizes that the essence of a human being is their connectome. The complexities and vast amount of neural connections in the human brain has slowed the complete mapping of the human connectome. This is in comparison to the only completely mapped connectome to date, that of the nematode Caenorhabditis elegans, a process that took over 12 years to complete despite the animal's hermaphrodite form only having a total of 302 neurons in its entire nervous system.

Seung proposes that a connectome is like a riverbed. As the water of a river, neural activity is constantly changing, never staying still. The connectome is the riverbed which both guides the neural activity while also being shaped by the water over time. Illustrating how thinking and neural activity alters the connectome adding to the difficulty of mapping the human connectome that is constantly changing.

=== Connectome: How the Brain’s Wiring Makes Us Who We Are ===
In his 2012 book Connectome, Seung discusses his current views on neuroscience and the upcoming science of connectomics. The book expands on some of the concepts discussed in his Ted talk as well as discussing how the doctrine of the connectome can be tested. He states that in order to test and further our knowledge and unlock to potential of the connectome we must improve the scientific tools in existence. Also, he states that there needs to be new ways to promote the concept of the connectome using the four R's: reweighting, reconnection, rewiring, and regeneration.

=== EyeWire.org ===
EyeWire is a computer game developed by Seung designed to map neuron cells in the human brain. Users can sign up for free, and the game helps contribute to ongoing cutting-edge scientific research. In Seung's own words:

We have this new site: Eyewire.org. It is a citizen science project. Our AI is not accurate enough to map the connectome by itself. We still need human intervention. So we have now created this website that allows anybody to do it.

Thus far site has recruited over 130,000 players from over 100 countries. KT Corporation, South Korea's largest telecom provider, recently partnered with EyeWire to advertise the game across the country and attract more players.

Essentially, in the game one has to identify and color connected components of neuron cells just from the 2d cross sections of brain tissue. As explained in his book "Connectome," up to now neuroscientists can only accurately image brain tissue using 2d sections (as opposed to 3d scans), which necessitates the need to splice these 2d pictures together to create a neural network map of the brain's inner connections. While artificial intelligence and computer vision can perform some of the manual work, it still takes a combined computer-human effort to map something as huge as the human brain, a computational endeavor that has perhaps never been attempted before at this scale in human history, hence the need for social computing.

=== Ongoing experiments ===
In the same way the Human Genome Project and the complete mapping of human DNA was fundamental for human biology and medicine, Seung and other connectomists hope that a complete map of the human brain can reveal critical information about memory and how humans think and perceive. These questions have been philosophically asked since the time of Aristotle, connectomics hopes to answer them scientifically.

Seung and his lab recently mapped the connectome of a female Drosophila melanogaster, utilized this mapped connectome to predict functions, and mapped part of the mouse connectome. He is collaborating with several scientists to reconstruct more fly connectomes with Mala Murthy, expand the mouse connectome with ophthalmologist Thomas Euler, explore murine memory with David Tank, decision making with Adrian Wanner and Jeff Lichtman, and utilizing reinforcement learning to understand connectomes with Ilana Witten.

== Publications and books ==
Seung has published multiple articles, over 15 in 2025 alone.

As aforementioned, he authored the book Connectome (2012). It has been translated into at least 26 languages.

== Awards and honors ==
He has been a Sloan Research Fellow, a Packard Fellow, and a McKnight Scholar; he also won the Ho-Am Prize in Engineering in 2008. He has been named top 10 non-fiction authors by the WSJ for his book Connectome. He is an External Member for the Max Planck Society. In 2026 he was awarded the Wiley Prize in Biomedical Sciences.

== Teaching ==
Seung has delivered lectures on how neurons might be wired together to form the engines of thought around the world.

In the past few years, he has been teaching Princeton's COS 485 Neural Networks, a course taken by both undergraduates and graduate students.

== Personal life ==
He currently lives with his wife and 3 daughters.

== Other references ==
- MIT Faculty page on Brain & Cognitive Sciences
- MIT Physics Faculty page
- Howard Hughes Medical Institute announcement
