= Biotinylated dextran amine =

Class of chemical compounds

Biotinylated dextran amines (BDA) are organic compounds used as anterograde and retrograde neuroanatomical tracers. They can be used for labeling the source as well as the point of termination of neural connections and therefore to study neural pathways.

BDA is delivered into the nervous system by iontophoretic or pressure injection and visualized with an avidin-biotinylated horseradish peroxidase procedure, followed by a standard or metal-enhanced diaminobenzidine (DAB) reaction. Samples can then be analyzed by optical microscopy as well as by electron microscopy.

There is a popular perception that BDA (and DAs in general) is an anterograde tracer. This is not the case and BDA spreads evenly when entering injured neurons. There is furthermore an allegation that high molecular weight BDA (10 kDa) shows selective anterograde behavior while low-MW BDA (3 kDa) shows the opposite. Joel C Glover, the inventor of BDA, believes that the influence of MW is overstated, and that the observed effect is probably reflective the differences in transport speeds (small molecules move faster) and the synaptic terminals having much smaller volume than the cell bodies.
