= Watt W. Webb =

American biophysicist (1927–2020)

Watt Wetmore Webb
- Born: August 27, 1927
- Died: October 29, 2020 (aged 93)
- Education: Massachusetts Institute of Technology
- Spouse: Page Chapman Webb
- Children: Watt Webb III, Spahr Webb and Bucknell Webb
- Parents: Watt Webb, Jr. (father); Anna C. Wetmore (mother)
- Scientific career
- Workplaces: Union Carbide
- Academic advisors: Carl Wagner
- Notable students: David W. Tank, Neil Gershenfeld, Malcolm Beasley

Watt Wetmore Webb (August 27, 1927 – October 29, 2020) was an American biophysicist, known for his co-invention (with Winfried Denk and Jim Strickler) of multiphoton microscopy in 1990.

== Early life and education ==
Watt Wetmore Webb was born on August 27, 1927, in Kansas City, Missouri. Webb hailed from a family of bankers. In 1891, his grandfather, Watt Webb, had founded the Missouri Savings Bank, an organization that would be led by Webb's uncle Wilson S. Webb, and eventually his father Watt Webb Jr. Due to a long illness, Watt W. Webb did not start formal schooling until the age of 10. As a young man, Webb worked at the family banking business; when Webb joined MIT as an undergraduate at 16 years old, he acceded to his parents request that he study business administration to prepare him to join the family banking business. Despite his business major, Webb took a number of science and engineering courses, and raced sailboats as part of MIT's sailing team. He completed his bachelor's degree in business and engineering administration in 1947, then went to work as an industrial engineer at Union Carbide Research Labs in Niagara Falls, New York, focused on submerged arc welding. He returned to MIT, completing his doctorate in materials science physics and mathematics in 1955.

== Research career ==
After his doctorate, Webb returned to Union Carbide as assistant director of research. In 1961, Watt moved to Ithaca, New York, to join the Cornell University faculty as an associate professor of engineering physics. There, in the early 1960s he developed the first stable superconducting magnet along with then-undergraduate Malcolm Beasley (who went on to do his PhD thesis work in Watt's lab as well). Webb was promoted to full professor in 1965.

In the early 1970s, Webb collaborated with Elliot Elson to develop a method to monitor the kinetics of chemical reactions, focused particularly on the binding of ethidium bromide to DNA. The result was the development of fluorescence correlation spectroscopy, which they described in a series of papers from 1972 to 1974. (Note: The papers, as cited by Elson in Webb's obituary, are: Magde D, Elson EL, Webb WW (1972). "Thermodynamic fluctuations in a reacting system—Measurement by fluorescence correlation spectroscopy". Phys. Rev. Lett. 29 (11): 705–708. Bibcode:1972PhRvL..29..705M. doi:10.1103/PhysRevLett.29.705.; Elson E, Magde D (1974). "Fluorescence correlation spectroscopy I. Conceptual basis and theory". Biopolymers. 13: 1–27. doi:10.1002/bip.1974.360130102. S2CID 97201376.; Magde D, Elson EL, Webb WW (1974). "Fluorescence correlation spectroscopy II. An experimental realization". Biopolymers. 13 (1): 29–61. doi:10.1002/bip.1974.360130103. PMID 4818131. S2CID 2832069.)

From 1983–1988 Webb served as director of the college's School of Applied and Engineering Physics. In the late 1980s, Webb – along with then PhD student in his laboratory Winfried Denk – built the first multiphoton microscope.

In 1998, Watt was named to an endowed professorship, the S. B. Eckert Professor in Engineering.

He has directed the NIH Developmental Resource for Biophysical Imaging Opto-Electronics for the last 20 years. He was on the board of directors and executive committee of the Cornell Center for Technology, Enterprise, and Commercialization, was affiliated with the university's Biophysics Program, the Cornell Center for Materials Research, the Nanobiotechnology Center and served on the Executive Committee of the Neuroscience Focus Area. He was a visiting scholar at Stanford University, a Guggenheim fellow, and a scholar in residence at the NIH Fogarty International Center for Advanced Study.

He was a fellow of the American Physical Society (APS) and the American Association for the Advancement of Science, a founding fellow of the American Institute for Medical and Biological Engineering, and an elected member of the National Academy of Engineering (1993), the National Academy of Sciences (1995), and the American Academy of Arts and Sciences.

He also received several awards for his work, including the American Physical Society's Max Delbruck Prize (then called the "Biological Physics Prize") in 1991, Case Western Reserve University's Michelson–Morley Award in 1999, the Rank Prize for Optoelectronics in 2000, and the New York Microscopical Society's Ernst Abbe Award in 2007.

Watt retired from active research as an emeritus professor in 2012.

He published over 310 papers in solid state and chemical physics and in biological physics; with 22 U.S. patents plus many foreign patents. He was active as a consultant and in various national advisory committees and professional societies.

His doctoral students include Malcolm Beasley, Winfried Denk, Neil Gershenfeld, and David W. Tank.

Webb died on October 29, 2020, in New York City at the age of 93.

== FCS and MPM ==
Professor Webb pioneered the techniques of Fluorescence Correlation Spectroscopy (FCS) in 1972 and Multiphoton microscopy (MPM) in 1990. FCS enables single-molecule detection in solutions at nanomolar concentrations and provides temporal resolution of the dynamic processes of individual molecules signaled by their fluorescence. FCS reveals molecular mobility, conformational fluctuations and chemical reactions in solutions and allows the detection of extremely sparse molecules and particles. In situ measurements of the dynamics of fluorescence flicker by FCS, photobleaching, phototoxicity, and induced fluorescence are being used to discern dynamics of biological processes and molecular mechanisms of disease. Multiphoton excitation in laser scanning fluorescence microscopy provides for high resolution, high signal-to-noise imaging in living cells and deep in turbid tissues in vivo and significantly reduces photodamage and minimizes image degradation due to scattering and autofluorescence. His laboratory at Cornell University continues to extend the frontiers of these technologies, now for example extending MPM and FCS to imaging molecular processes within the cellular nucleus for gene expression in vivo. Recently initiated is the development of technology for introduction of MPM into Medical Endoscopy for in vivo, in situ real time diagnostics.

== Honors ==
In 2010 Webb was awarded the Alexander Hollaender Award in Biophysics by the National Academy of Sciences. Was awarded the Rosenstiel Award in 2013.

== Personal life ==
Webb was an avid sailor, together with his wife Page Chapman – whom he met sailing on the Charles River while Webb pursued his bachelor's degree. Together they raced sailing yachts across the northeast well into their 70s. They had three children together, a son in 1954, and twin boys in 1956.
