= Multi-photon microscopy =

Multi-photon microscopy (also spelled multiphoton microscopy) may refer to:

- Two-photon excitation microscopy
- Three photon microscopy
- Second-harmonic imaging microscopy
- Third-harmonic imaging microscopy
- Coherent Raman scattering microscopy
- Stimulated Raman scattering microscopy
