= Human Connectome Project =

Research project

The Human Connectome Project (HCP) was a five-year project (later extended to 10 years) sponsored by sixteen components of the National Institutes of Health, split between two consortia of research institutions. The project was launched in July 2009 as the first of three Grand Challenges of the NIH's Blueprint for Neuroscience Research. On September 15, 2010, the NIH announced that it would award two grants: $30 million over five years to a consortium led by Washington University in St. Louis and the University of Minnesota, with strong contributions from University of Oxford (FMRIB) and $8.5 million over three years to a consortium led by Harvard University, Massachusetts General Hospital and the University of California Los Angeles.

The goal of the Human Connectome Project was to build a "network map" (connectome) that sheds light on the anatomical and functional connectivity within the healthy human brain, as well as to produce a body of data that will facilitate research into brain disorders such as dyslexia, autism, Alzheimer's disease, and schizophrenia.

A number of successor projects are currently in progress, based on the Human Connectome Project results.

== WU-Minn-Oxford consortium ==
The WU-Minn-Oxford consortium developed improved MRI instrumentation, image acquisition and image analysis methods for mapping the connectivity in the human brain at spatial resolutions significantly better than previously available; using these methods, WU-Minn-Oxford consortium collected a large amount of MRI and behavioral data on 1,200 healthy adults — twin pairs and their siblings from 300 families - using a special 3-tesla MRI instrument. In addition, it scanned 184 subjects from this pool at 7 tesla, with higher spatial resolution. The data were analyzed to show the anatomical and functional connections between parts of the brain for each individual, and were related to behavioral test data. Comparing the connectomes and genetic data of genetically identical twins with fraternal twins revealed the relative contributions of genes and environment in shaping brain circuitry and pinpointed relevant genetic variation. The maps also shed light on how brain networks are organized.

Using a combination of non-invasive imaging technologies, including resting-state fMRI and task-based functional MRI, MEG and EEG, and diffusion MRI, the WU-Minn mapped connectomes at the macro scale — mapping large brain systems that were divided into anatomically and functionally distinct areas, rather than mapping individual neurons.

Dozens of investigators and researchers from nine institutions contributed to this project. Research institutions include: Washington University in St. Louis, the Center for Magnetic Resonance Research at the University of Minnesota, University of Oxford, Saint Louis University, Indiana University, D'Annunzio University of Chieti–Pescara, Ernst Strungmann Institute, Warwick University, Advanced MRI Technologies, and the University of California at Berkeley.

The data that resulted from this research is publicly available in an open-source web-accessible neuroinformatics platform.

== MGH/Harvard-UCLA consortium ==
The MGH/Harvard-UCLA consortium focussed on optimizing MRI technology for imaging the brain's structural connections using diffusion MRI, with a goal of increasing spatial resolution, quality, and speed. Diffusion MRI, employed in both projects, maps the brain's fibrous long-distance connections by tracking the motion of water. Water diffusion patterns in different types of cells allow the detection of different types of tissues. Using this imaging method, the long extensions of neurons, called white matter, can be seen in sharp relief.

The new scanner built at the MGH Martinos Center for this project was "4 to 8 times as powerful as conventional systems, enabling imaging of human neuroanatomy with greater sensitivity than was previously possible." The scanner has a maximum gradient strength of 300 mT/m and a slew rate of 200 T/m/s, with b-values tested up to 20,000 s/mm^2. For comparison, a standard gradient coil is 45 mT/m.

== Behavioral testing and measurement ==
To investigate the relationship between brain connectivity and behaviour clearer, the Human Connectome Project used a battery of measures that assess a wide range of human functions. The core of its battery is the tools and methods developed by the NIH Toolbox for Assessment of Neurological and Behavioral function.

== Research ==
In August 2025, the HCP-Young Adult 2025 Release updated dataset on a new platform called "ConnectomeDB powered by BALSA". The main highlights are significant advances in data processing applied to all the functional Magnetic Resonance Imaging (fMRI) data, multi-run FIX (FMRIB's ICA-based Xnoiseifier) for the 3 tesla task fMRI data, and improvements in temporal Independent Component Analysis (ICA) pipelines while aligning with earlier processing packages of the HCP Lifespan projects. This contributes to the further exploration of the human brain in a large cohort of healthy young adults.

The Human Connectome Project has grown into a large group of research teams. These teams make use of the style of brain scanning developed by the Project. The studies usually include using large groups of participants, scanning many angles of participants' brains, and carefully documenting the location of the structures in each participant's brain. Studies affiliated with the Human Connectome Project are currently cataloged by the Connectome Coordination Facility. The studies fall into three categories: Healthy Adult Connectomes, Lifespan Connectome Data, and Connectomes Related to Human Disease. Under each of these categories are research groups working on specific questions.

=== Healthy Adult Connectomes ===
The Human Connectome Project Young Adult study made data on the brain connections of 1100 healthy young adults available to the scientific community. Scientists have used data from the study to support theories about which areas of the brain communicate with one another. For example, one study used data from the project to show that the amygdala, a part of the brain essential for emotional processing, is connected to the parts of the brain that receive information from the senses and plan movement. Another study showed that healthy individuals who had a high tendency to experience anxious or depressed mood had fewer connections between the amygdala and a number of brain areas related to attention.

=== Lifespan Connectome Data ===
There are currently four research groups collecting data on connections in the brains of populations other than young adults. The purpose of these groups is to determine ordinary brain connectivity during infancy, childhood, adolescence, and aging. Scientists will use the data from these research groups in the same manner in which they have used data from the Human Connectome Project Young Adult study.

=== Connectomes Related to Human Disease ===
Fourteen research groups investigate how connections in the brain change during the course of a particular disease. Four of the groups focus on Alzheimer's disease or dementia. Alzheimer's disease and dementia are diseases that begin during aging. Memory loss and cognitive impairment mark the progression of these diseases. While scientists consider Alzheimer's disease to be a disease with a specific cause, dementia actually describes symptoms which could be attributed to a number of causes. Two other research groups investigate how diseases that disrupt vision change connectivity in the brain. Another four of the research groups focus on anxiety disorders and major depressive disorder, psychological disorders that result in abnormal emotional regulation. Two more of the research groups focus on the effects of psychosis, a symptom of some psychological disorders in which an individual perceives reality differently than others do. One of the teams researches epilepsy, a disease characterized by seizures. Finally, one research team is documenting the brain connections of the Amish people, a religious and ethnic group that has high rates of some psychological disorders.

Although theories have been put forth about the way brain connections change in the diseases under investigation, many of these theories have been supported by data from healthy populations. For example, an analysis of the brains of healthy individuals supported the theory that individuals with anxiety disorders and depression have less connectivity between their emotional centers and the areas that govern attention. By collecting data specifically from individuals with these diseases, researchers hope to have a more certain idea of how brain connections in these individuals change over time.

== Status ==
The project was completed in 2021, and a retrospective analysis is available. A number of new projects have started based on the results.

== Useful links ==
- HCP wiki - Human Connectome Project wiki
- ICA-FIX - Documentation on ICA-FIX algorithm used on resting state fMRI data

== See also ==
- Connectome: How the Brain's Wiring Makes Us Who We Are
- Connectomics
- Connectogram
- Human Brain Project
- Outline of brain mapping
- Outline of the human brain
