= Viral neuronal tracing =

Use of viruses to study the nervous system

Viral neuronal tracing is the use of a virus to trace neural pathways, providing a self-replicating tracer. Viruses have the advantage of self-replication over molecular tracers but can also spread too quickly and cause degradation of neural tissue. Viruses that can infect the nervous system, called neurotropic viruses, spread through spatially close assemblies of neurons through synapses, allowing for their use in studying functionally connected neural networks.

The use of viruses to label functionally connected neurons stems from the work and bioassay developed by Albert Sabin. Subsequent research allowed for the incorporation of immunohistochemical techniques to systematically label neuronal connections. To date, viruses have been used to study multiple circuits in the nervous system.

== Neuronal Cartography ==
The individual connections of neurons have long evaded neuroanatomists. Neuronal tracing methods offer an unprecedented view into the morphology and connectivity of neural networks. Depending on the tracer used, this can be limited to a single neuron or can progress trans-synoptically to adjacent neurons. After the tracer has spread sufficiently, the extent may be measured either by fluorescence (for dyes) or by immunohistochemistry (for biological tracers). An important innovation in this field is the use of neurotropic viruses as tracers. These not only spread throughout the initial site of infection but can jump across synapses.

== Virus life cycle ==
The life cycle of viruses, such as those used in neuronal tracing, is different from cellular organisms. Viruses are parasitic in nature and cannot proliferate on their own. Therefore, they must infect another organism and effectively hijack cellular machinery to complete their life cycle.

The first stage of the viral life cycle is called viral entry. This defines the manner in which a virus infects a new host cell. In nature, neurotropic viruses are usually transmitted through bites or scratches, as in the case of the rabies virus or certain strains of herpes viruses. In tracing studies, this step occurs artificially, typically through the use of a syringe. The next stage of the viral life cycle is called viral replication. During this stage, the virus takes over the host cell's machinery to cause the cell to create more viral proteins and assemble more viruses.

Once the cell has produced a sufficient number of viruses, the virus enters the viral shedding stage. During this stage, viruses leave the original host cell in search of a new host. In the case of neurotropic viruses, this transmission typically occurs at the synapse. Viruses can jump across a relatively short space from one neuron to the next. This trait is what makes viruses so useful in tracer studies.

Once the virus enters the next cell, the cycle begins anew. The original host cell begins to degrade after the shedding stage. In tracer studies, this is the reason the timing must be tightly controlled. If the virus is allowed to spread too far, the original microcircuitry of interest is degraded, and no useful information can be retrieved. Typically, viruses can infect only a small number of organisms, and even then, only a specific cell type within the body. The specificity of a particular virus for a specific tissue is known as its tropism. Viruses in tracer studies are all neurotropic (capable of infecting neurons).

== Methods ==
=== Infection ===
The viral tracer may be introduced in peripheral organs, such as a muscle or gland. Certain viruses, such as adeno-associated virus, can be injected into the bloodstream and can cross the blood–brain barrier to infect the brain. It may also be introduced into a ganglion or injected directly into the brain using a stereotactic device. These methods offer unique insight into how the brain and its periphery are connected.

Viruses are introduced into neuronal tissue in many different ways. There are two major methods to introduce tracers into the target tissues.

1. Pressure injection requires the tracer, in liquid form, to be injected directly into the cell. This is the most common method.
2. Iontophoresis involves the application of current to the tracer solution within an electrode. The tracer molecules pick up a charge and are driven into the cell via the electric field. This is a useful method if the cell should be labelled after performing the patch clamp technique.

Once the tracer is introduced into the cell, the aforementioned transport mechanisms take over. Then, the virus starts to infect cells in the local area once it enters the nervous system. The viruses function by incorporating their own genetic material into the genome of the infected cells. The host cell will then produce the proteins encoded by the gene. Researchers are able to incorporate numerous genes into the infected neurons, including fluorescent proteins used for visualization. Further advances in neuronal tracing allow for the targeted expression of fluorescent proteins to specific cell types.

=== Histology and imaging ===
Once the virus has spread to the desired extent, the brain is sliced and mounted on slides. Then, fluorescent antibodies that are either specific for the virus, or fluorescent complementary DNA probes for viral DNA, are washed over the slices and imaged under a fluorescence microscope.

== Direction of transmission ==
Virus transmission relies on the mechanism of axoplasmic transport. Within the axon are long slender protein complexes called microtubules. They act as a cytoskeleton to help the cell maintain its shape. These can also act as highways within the axon and facilitate the transport of neurotransmitter-filled vesicles and enzymes back and forth between the cell body, or soma and the axon terminal, or synapse.

Viruses can be transported in one of two directions: either anterograde (from soma to synapse), or retrograde (from synapse to soma). Neurons naturally transport proteins, neurotransmitters, and other macromolecules via these cellular pathways. Neuronal tracers, including viruses, take advantage of these transport mechanisms to distribute a tracer throughout a cell. Researchers can use this to study synaptic circuitry.

=== Anterograde transport ===
Anterograde tracing is the use of a tracer that moves from soma to synapse. Anterograde transport uses a protein called kinesin to move viruses along the axon in the anterograde direction.

=== Retrograde transport ===
Retrograde tracing is the use of a tracer that moves from synapse to soma. Retrograde transport uses a protein called dynein to move viruses along the axon in the retrograde direction. Different tracers show characteristic affinities for dynein and kinesin, and so will spread at different rates.

=== Dual transport ===
At times, it is desirable to trace neurons upstream and downstream to determine both the inputs and the outputs of neural circuitry. This uses a combination of the above mechanisms.

== Benefits and drawbacks ==
=== Benefits ===
One of the benefits of using viral tracers is the ability of the virus to jump across synapses. This allows for the tracing of microcircuitry as well as projection studies. Few molecular tracers are able to do this, and those that can usually have a decreased signal in secondary neurons, which leads to the other benefit of viral tracing - viruses can self-replicate. As soon as the secondary neuron is infected, the virus begins multiplying and replicating. There is no loss of signal as the tracer propagates through the brain.

=== Drawbacks ===
As viruses propagate through the nervous system, the viral tracers infect neurons and ultimately destroy them. As such, the timing of tracer studies must be precise to allow adequate propagation before neural death occurs, causing large-scale harm to the body.

It has been difficult to find viruses perfectly suited for the task. A virus used for tracing should ideally be just mildly infectious to give good results, but not deadly as to destroy neural tissue too quickly or pose unnecessary risks to those exposed.

Another drawback is that viral neuronal tracing currently requires the additional step of attaching fluorescent antibodies to the viruses to visualize the path. In contrast, most molecular tracers are brightly colored and can be viewed with the naked eye, without additional modification.

== Current uses ==
Viral tracing is primarily used to trace neuronal circuits. Researchers use one of the previously mentioned viruses to study how neurons in the brain are connected to each other with a very fine level of detail. Connectivity largely determines how the brain functions. Viruses have been used to study retinal ganglion circuits, cortical circuits, and spinal circuits, among others.

== Viruses in use ==
The following is a list of viruses currently in use for the purpose of neuronal tracing.

- Herpes simplex virus (Herpesviridae family) – anterograde
- Pseudorabies virus PRV (Herpesviridae family) – retrograde trans-synaptic and anterograde
- Rabies virus (Rhabdoviridae family) – retrograde trans-synaptic.
- Vesicular stomatitis virus (Rhabdoviridae family) – anterograde.
- Sindbis virus (Togaviridae family) – anterograde with small amount retrograde.
- Adeno-associated virus AAV (Parvoviridae family) – anterograde.
