= Malcolm Beasley =

American physicist

Malcolm Roy Beasley (born January 4, 1940, in San Francisco) is an American physicist. He is professor emeritus of applied physics at Stanford University. He is known for his research related to superconductivity.

== Early life and education ==
Beasley was born at Stanford hospital, moving to Hawaii during World War II with his parents, who were social scientists. He was a high school and college basketball player, earning All-Metropolitan honors at Montgomery Blair High School in Silver Spring, Maryland, and playing for the Cornell Big Red in 1958-59.

At Cornell University, Beasley earned his bachelor's degree in engineering physics in 1962 and his Ph.D. in 1967. His Ph.D. thesis Flux creep in hard superconductors was supervised by Watt W. Webb.

== Academic career ==
Beasley joined the faculty of Harvard University in 1968 where he remained until accepting a position at Stanford in 1974. He was recruited to Stanford by Theodore Geballe, and after Aharon Kapitulnik joined the applied physics department, the three Stanford superconductivity researchers became known as the "KGB Group."

In 1991, Beasley was elected a Fellow of the American Academy of Arts and Sciences. He was elected a member of the National Academy of Sciences in 1993.

In 1998, Beasley was named dean of the School of Humanities and Sciences at Stanford.

In 2002, Beasley served as chairman of the Jan Hendrik Schön commission, which determined that Schön fabricated much of his published research.

In 2011, Beasley was elected to the Presidential line of the American Physical Society, becoming APS President in 2014.
