= Eyewire =

Human-based computation game

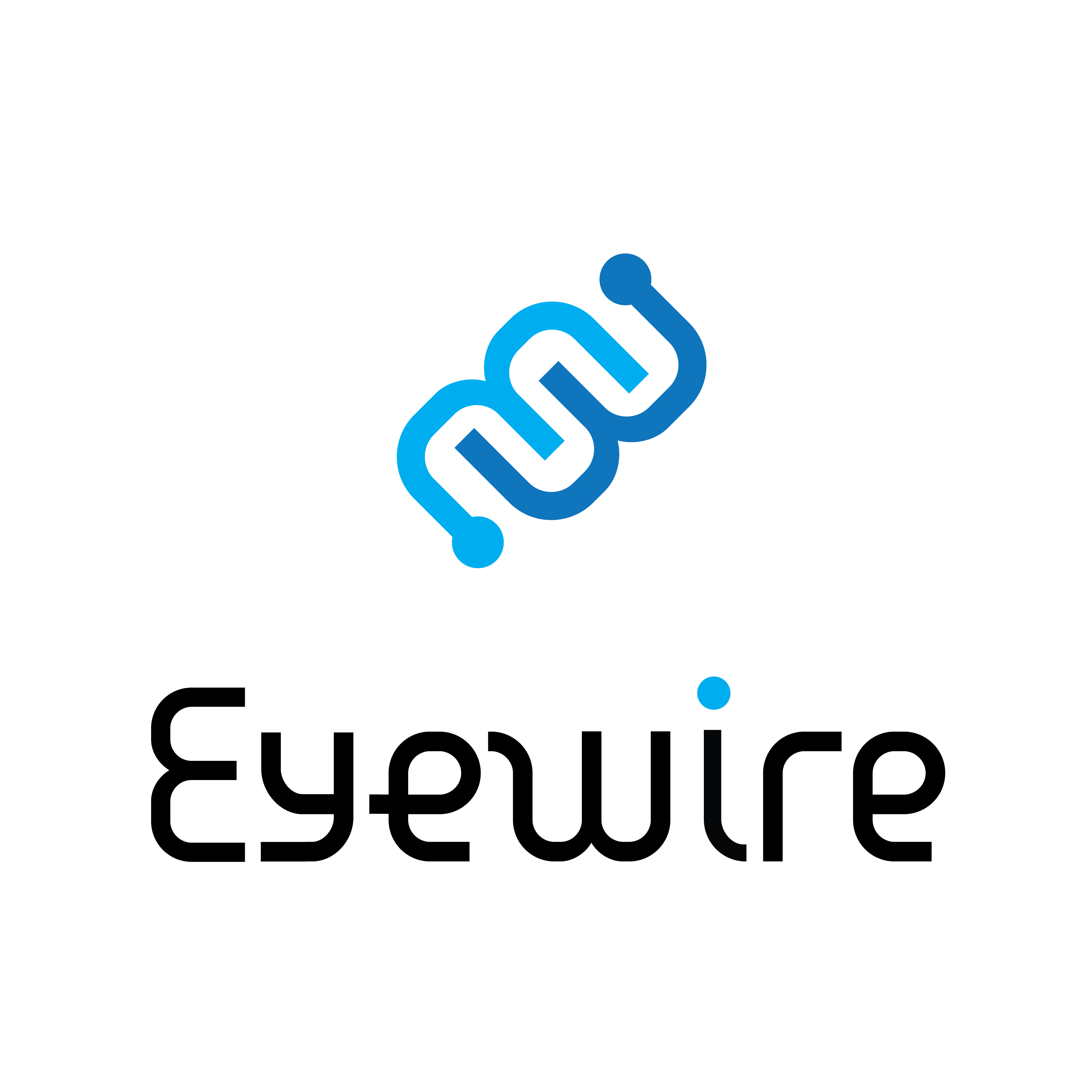
- Developer: Sebastian Seung of Princeton University (formerly Massachusetts Institute of Technology)
- Director: Amy Sterling
- Platform: Webbrowser (WebGL)
- Release: December 10, 2012
- Genres: Puzzle, citizen science

Eyewire is a citizen science game from Sebastian Seung's Lab at Princeton University. It is a human-based computation game that uses players to map retinal neurons. Eyewire launched on December 10, 2012. The game utilizes data generated by the Max Planck Institute for Medical Research. As of March 2025, Eyewire has had around 350,000 players and resulted in the tracing of 6,000 neurons.

Eyewire gameplay is used for neuroscience research by enabling the reconstruction of morphological neuron data, which helps researchers model information-processing circuits. It is also used to generate a training dataset to further improve the artificial intelligence that assists the player through the gameplay.

A later project spawned from Eyewire is the Flywire project, which used a similar but more selective citizen science system for its tracing and annotation. Flywire builds on Eyewire and used AIs trained on the dataset produced by Eyewire players. Flywire would go on to complete and publish the first connectome of an adult fruit fly, a structure with about 140,000 neurons.

A sequel project to Eyewire, Eyewire II, was announced on March 31, 2025. It is of a similar scale to Flywire, intending to trace over 100,000 new neurons. Eyewire II is open in its alpha stages to Eyewire players ranked Scythe or higher. Eyewire II covers 1 mm^{2} of the mouse retina, 10 to 100 times of previous retina imaging attempts. A June 2026 preprint reports that humans have already proofread 25,000 cells from the dataset.

== Gameplay ==
The player is given a cube with a partially reconstructed neuron branch stretching through it. The player completes the reconstruction by coloring a 2D image (a slice of the volume) with a 3D image generated simultaneously. Reconstructions are compared across players as each cube is submitted, with points yielded to the players based on the agreement of their reconstruction with the developed consensus. Players are ranked on a leaderboard based on their point contributions.

By coloring the 2D image to mark neuron parts, the player performs semantic image segmentation. By doing so across consecutive slices, a small volume is segmented, achieving neuronal tracing.

== Goal ==
Eyewire is used to advance the use of artificial intelligence in neuronal reconstruction by providing a dataset from which to train and test new models. It is also hoped that the neuronal reconstruction data from Eyewire and other similar projects will result a 'virtuous cycle,' where the neuroscience discoveries achieved from analyzing real neural networks could result in improvements to artificial intelligence, and that this newer artificial intelligence could then speed up further connectomic work.

The retina connectivity data is used to determine how mammals see directional motion.

== Methods ==
The activity of each neuron in a 350 × 300 × 60 μm^{3} portion of a retina was determined by two-photon microscopy. Using serial block-face scanning electron microscopy, the same volume was stained to bring out the contrast of the plasma membranes, sliced into layers by a microtome, and imaged using an electron microscope.

A number of in-progress neurons are selected by the researchers for tracing. After the player chooses which neuron to work on, the program chooses a cubic volume associated with that neuron for the player. This volume is first segmented into a number of (invisible to the player) supervoxels before an artificial intelligence (AI) performs a conservative best guess for tracing the neuron through the two-dimensional images. The AI used is a convolutional deep neural network, a type of AI often used for feature detectors. Multiple players will independently finish the reconstruction of the cube, creating a community consensus that is then submitted. These submitted consensuses are then checked by more experienced players.

=== Eyewire II ===
For Eyewire II, the retina from an adult (three-month-old) male mouse was made to "watch" a number of visual stimuli while two-photon Ca^{2+} microscopy makes a video recording of the activity in its ganglion cell layer. As with the earlier experiment, it was stained with thiocarbohydrazide and underwent serial block-face scanning electron microscopy.

Initial image segmentation was performed by a more advanced AI from Zetta, which was then proofread by humans: 28 scientists, 72 paid and trained specialists, and 11 volunteers. Ribbon synapses were detected by another AI from Zetta using this human-checked segmentation. While proofreading, the experts also assigned cell types based on the shapes of the cells, which was used to train a random forest algorithm to classify all cells. Additional unsupervised classification (clustering) revealed subtypes of cells. The 15 subtypes of retinal bipolar cells detected were found to match previously-reported cell types while the different subtypes of retinal ganglion cells showed the expected responses to light stimulation when checked against the Ca^{2+} recordings.

== Accomplishments ==
- Eyewire neurons featured at 2014 TED Conference Virtual Reality Exhibit.
- Eyewire neurons featured at US Science and Engineering Expo in Washington, DC.
- Eyewire won the United States National Science Foundation's 2013 International Visualization Challenge in the Games and Apps Category.
- An Eyewire image by Alex Norton won MIT's 2014 Koch Image Gallery Competition.
- Eyewire named one of Discover Magazine's Top 100 Science Stories of 2013.
- Eyewire named top citizen science project of 2013 by SciStarter.
- Eyewire won Biovision's World Life Sciences Forum Catalyzer Prize on March 26, 2013.
- Eyewire named to top 10 citizen science projects of 2013 by PLoS.

Eyewire has been featured by Wired, Nature's blog SpotOn, Forbes, Scientific American, and NPR.
