= Winfried Denk =

20th- and 21st-century German physicist and neurobiologist

- Born: November 12, 1957 (age 69); Munich, Germany
- Occupation: Physicist
- Known for: Serial block-face scanning electron microscopy Two-photon excitation microscopy
- Awards: Michael and Kate Bárány Award (1998); Leibniz Prize (2003); W. Alden Spencer Award (2006); Kavli Prize (2012); Rosenstiel Award (2013); The Brain Prize (2015)

Academic background
- Academic advisor: Watt W. Webb

Winfried Denk (born November 12, 1957, in Munich) is a German physicist. He built the first two-photon microscope while he was a graduate student (and briefly a postdoc) in Watt W. Webb's lab at Cornell University, in 1989.

== Early life and education ==
Denk was born in Munich, Germany. As a child he spent most of his playtime learning to use the tools and building materials in his father's workshop. In school, it became apparent that Denk’s ‘talents were unevenly spread across subjects, math and physics being favored’. Fixing and constructing electronic devices was his main hobby throughout high school.

After high school, Denk completed the mandatory 15-month stint in the German army and spent the next 3 years at LMU Munich. In 1981, he moved to Zurich to study at ETH Zurich. During this time, he also worked in the lab of Dieter Pohl, at the IBM laboratory. There he built one of the first super-resolution microscopes and developed a passion for scanning microscopy. He did his master's thesis in the lab of Kurt Wüthrich, under the direct guidance of Gerhard Wagner. But he felt that NMR spectroscopy was not for him because it did not involve enough opportunities to create new experimental gadgets.

In 1984, Denk joined the lab of Watt W. Webb at Cornell. While Webb himself was extremely interested in methods – both fluorescence-correlation and photo bleaching-recovery spectroscopy had been invented in his lab – he gave students and postdocs a lot of freedom. Denk enjoyed his time at Cornell but was almost fired after he went to Greece for six weeks to study monk seals. Given a second chance, he started a project aimed at measuring the motion of sensory hair-bundles in the inner ear. One of the attractions of this endeavor was that it required a stay in San Francisco, in order to learn from Jim Hudspeth and his group about hair-cells in general and specifically how to prepare them for the planned measurements.

Denk returned to Cornell and invented a method sensitive enough to measure the thermal movement of hair-bundles. He went on to show that hair cells can sense their own Brownian motion.

Central to Denk's early career was his intuition that two-photon (2p) imaging might damage the sample less than one-photon confocal imaging. He predicted this in spite of the fact that peak light intensity for 2p is almost one million times higher than for the confocal microscope. Equally important was his insight that infrared 2p excitation would allow scattered fluorescence to contribute to images even deep in turbid samples, improving the optical access and resolution of 2p imaging over what was possible using confocal imaging.

Nowhere has this proven more valuable than when imaging neurons in living brain tissue. Two-photon microscopy remains the only technique that allows the recording of activity in living brains with high spatial resolution. 2p excitation can also be used to map cells' receptor distributions by releasing substances from their chemical "cages".

Denk later demonstrated that 2p can be utilized to record activity in the visually stimulated retina. He also showed that it can be combined with adaptive optics to improve resolution, and with amplified pulses to push the depth limit to 1mm in brain tissue. Today, two-photon excitation microscopy is also used in the fields of physiology, embryology and tissue engineering, as well as in cancer research.

The sparsity of data on connectivity between neurons had been a major limitation in circuit neuroscience. Denk’s 2004 paper describing automated serial blockface microscopy rekindled the dormant science of comprehensive neural circuit mapping (connectomics), pioneered by Sydney Brenner.

Denk was Director at the Max Planck Institute for Biological Intelligence (formerly Max Planck Institute of Neurobiology) and retired in 2025. He continues working to improve techniques for circuit-mapping in the rodent brain. His most recent work involves precisely determining the positions, orientations, and identities of proteins and bound ligands in cryo-preserved cells.

== Notable papers ==
Denk, Stricker & Webb1990, Science. Two-photon laser scanning fluorescence microscopy

Denk 1994, Proc Natl Acad Sci USA. Two-photon scanning photochemical microscopy: mapping ligand-gated ion channel distribution

Yuste & Denk 1995, Nature. Dendritic spines as basic functional units of neuronal integration

Svoboda, Tank & Denk 1996, Science. Direct measurement of coupling between dendritic spines and shafts.

Euler, Detwiler & Denk 2002, Nature. Directionally selective calcium signals in dendrites of starburst amacrine cells.

Denk & Horstmann 2004, PLoS Biology. Serial Block-Face Scanning Electron Microscopy to Reconstruct Three-Dimensional Tissue Nanostructure

Helmchen & Denk 2005, Nature Methods. Deep tissue two-photon microscopy

Briggman et al. 2011, Nature. Wiring specificity in the direction-selectivity circuit of the retina

Helmstaedter et al. 2013, Nature. Connectomic reconstruction of the inner plexiform layer in the mouse retina

== Recognition ==
- 1998 Young Investigator Award of the Biophysical Society
- 2000 Rank Prize for Opto-Electronics
- 2003 Leibniz Prize of the DFG (German Research Council)
- 2006 W. Alden Spencer Award, Columbia University, New York
- 2012 Kavli Prize in Neuroscience, Norwegian Academy of Science and Letters
- 2013 Elected International member American National Academy of Sciences (NAS)
- 2013 Rosenstiel Award
- 2015 Brain Prize (Grete Lundbeck European Brain Research Foundation)
- 2015 International Prize for Translational Neuroscience of the Gertrud Reemtsma Foundation

== Service ==
- 2014 Member of the European Molecular Biology Organization (EMBO)
- 2015 Member of the German National Academy of Sciences Leopoldina
- 2016 Member of the Bavarian Academy of Sciences and Humanities
