= Hydroxystilbamidine =

Names
- Preferred IUPAC name 4-[(E)-2-(4-Carbamimidoylphenyl)ethen-1-yl]-3-hydroxybenzene-1-carboximidamide

Identifiers
CAS Number	495-99-8
3D model (JSmol)	Interactive image
ChEMBL	ChEMBL1301
ChemSpider	10612853
ECHA InfoCard	100.007.102
PubChem CID	5353676
UNII	39J262E49W
CompTox Dashboard (EPA)	DTXSID3023136
- InChI: InChI=1S/C16H16N4O/c17-15(18)12-5-2-10(3-6-12)1-4-11-7-8-13(16(19)20)9-14(11)21/h1-9,21H,(H3,17,18)(H3,19,20)/b4-1+ Key: TUESWZZJYCLFNL-DAFODLJHSA-N; InChI=1/C16H16N4O/c17-15(18)12-5-2-10(3-6-12)1-4-11-7-8-13(16(19)20)9-14(11)21/h1-9,21H,(H3,17,18)(H3,19,20)/b4-1+ Key: TUESWZZJYCLFNL-DAFODLJHBK
- SMILES: Oc2cc(ccc2/C=C/c1ccc(cc1)C(N)=N)C(N)=N

Properties
Chemical formula	C_{16}H_{16}N_{4}O
Molar mass	280.324 g/mol
- Except where otherwise noted, data are given for materials in their standard state (at 25 °C [77 °F], 100 kPa). verify (what is ?) Infobox references

PVH neurons of Long-Evans rat marked with fluoro-gold

Hydroxystilbamidine is a fluorescent dye that emits different frequencies of light when bound to DNA and RNA. It is used as a retrograde tracer for outlining neurons, and as a histochemical stain.
