= Serial block-face scanning electron microscopy =

Method of 3D bioimaging

Serial block-face scanning electron microscopy is a method to generate high resolution three-dimensional images from small samples. The technique was developed for brain tissue, but it is widely applicable for any biological samples. A serial block-face scanning electron microscope consists of an ultramicrotome mounted inside the vacuum chamber of a scanning electron microscope. Samples are prepared by methods similar to that in transmission electron microscopy (TEM), typically by fixing the sample with aldehyde, staining with heavy metals such as osmium and uranium then embedding in an epoxy resin. The surface of the block of resin-embedded sample is imaged by detection of back-scattered electrons. Following imaging the ultramicrotome is used to cut a thin section (typically around 30 nm) from the face of the block. After the section is cut, the sample block is raised back to the focal plane and imaged again. This sequence of sample imaging, section cutting and block raising can acquire many thousands of images in perfect alignment in an automated fashion. Practical serial block-face scanning electron microscopy was invented in 2004 by Winfried Denk at the Max-Planck-Institute in Heidelberg and is commercially available from Gatan Inc., Thermo Fisher Scientific (VolumeScope) and ConnectomX.

== Applications ==
One of the first applications of serial block-face scanning electron microscopy was to analyze the connectivity of axons in the brain. The resolution is sufficient to trace even the thinnest axons and to identify synapses. By now, serial block face imaging contributed to many fields, like developmental biology, plant biology, cancer research, studying neuro-degenerative diseases etc. The technique can generate extremely large data sets, and development of algorithms for automatic segmentation of the very large data sets generated is still a challenge. However much work is being done on this area currently. The EyeWire project harnesses human computation in a game to trace neurons through images of a volume of retina obtained using serial block-face scanning electron microscopy.

Many different samples can be prepared for serial block-face scanning electron microscopy and the ultramicrotome is able to cut many materials, therefore this technique has wider applicability. It is starting to find applications in many other areas ranging from cell and developmental biology to materials science.

== Advantages and disadvantages ==
A disadvantage encountered with the SBEM method is that the thickness of the slice which can be removed with the ultra-microtome is limited (~25 nm), thus the resolution in the depth direction is limited. An advantage of the SBEM technique is that the specimen is stationary what improves the alignment in the stacks of images. Another advantage of the SBEM technique is the ability to acquire large data sets with a high level of detail. Because cutting by the ultra-microtome is extremely fast (comparing to the milling process in FIB-SEM), it can expose a wide area of the material (x and y directions) every sectioning. Additionally, by fast cutting, we can acquire many images in z-direction in a short period of time.

== See also ==
- Focused ion beam
