= Three-photon microscopy =

Three-photon microscopy (3PEF) is a high-resolution fluorescence microscopy based on nonlinear excitation effect. Different from two-photon excitation microscopy, it uses three exciting photons. It typically uses 1300 nm or longer wavelength lasers to excite the fluorescent dyes with three simultaneously absorbed photons. The fluorescent dyes then emit one photon whose energy is (slightly smaller than) three times the energy of each incident photon. Compared to two-photon microscopy, three-photon microscopy reduces the fluorescence away from the focal plane by $1/z^4$, which is much faster than that of two-photon microscopy by $1/z^2$. In addition, three-photon microscopy employs near-infrared light with less tissue scattering effect. This causes three-photon microscopy to have higher resolution than conventional microscopy.

== Concept ==
Three-photon excited fluorescence was first observed by Singh and Bradley in 1964 when they estimated the three-photon absorption cross section of naphthalene crystals. In 1996, Stefan W. Hell designed experiments to validate the feasibility of applying three-photon excitation to scanning fluorescence microscopy, which further proved the concept of three-photon excited fluorescence.

Three-photon microscopy shares a few similarities with Two-photon excitation microscopy. Both of them employ the point scanning method. Both are able to image 3D samples by adjusting the position of the focus lens along the axial and lateral directions. The structures of both systems do not require a pinhole to block out-focus light. However, three-photon microscopy differs from Two-photon excitation microscopy in their Point spread function, resolution, penetration depth, resistance to out-of-focus light and strength of photobleaching.

In three-photon excitation, the fluorophore absorbs three photons almost simultaneously. The wavelength of the excitation laser is about 1200 nm or more in three photon microscopy with the emission wavelength slightly longer than one-third of the excitation wavelength. Three photon microscopy has deeper tissue penetration because of the longer excitation wavelengths and the higher order nonlinear excitation. However, a three-photon microscope needs a laser with higher power due to relatively smaller cross-section of the dyes for three-photon excitation, which is on the order of $10^{-82}\text{cm}^6(s/\text{photon})^2$. This is much smaller than the typical two-photon excitation cross-sections of $10^{-49}\text{cm}^4s/\text{photon}$. The Ultrashort pulses are usually around 100 fs.

== Resolution ==
For three photon fluorescence scanning microscopy, the three dimensional intensity point-spread function (IPSF) can be denoted as,

$h_i(\nu,u) = \left|I_1(\nu/3,u/3)\right|^3I_2(\nu,u) \otimes_3 D$,

where $\otimes_3$ denotes the 3-D convolution operation, $D$ denotes the intensity sensitivity of an incoherent detector, and $I_1(\nu,u)$, $I_2(\nu,u)$ denotes the 3-D IPSF for the objective lens and collector lens in single-photon fluorescence, respectively. The 3-D IPSF $I_1(\nu,u)$ can be expressed in

$I_1(\nu,u) = \left|\int_{0}^{1}2J_0(\nu\rho)\exp(iu/2)\rho d\rho\right|^2$,

where $J_0$ is a Bessel function of the first kind of order zero. The axial and radial coordinates $u$ and $\nu$ are defined by

$u = (8\pi/\lambda_f)z \sin^2(\alpha_0/2)$ and

$\nu = (2\pi/\lambda_f)r\ \sin\ \alpha_0$,

where $\alpha_0$ is the numerical aperture of the objective lens, $z$ is the real defocus, and $r$ is the radial coordinates.

== Coupling with other multiphoton techniques ==
Correlative images can be obtained using different multiphoton schemes such as 2PEF, 3PEF, and third-harmonic generation (THG), in parallel (since the corresponding wavelengths are different, they can be easily separated onto different detectors). A multichannel image is then constructed.

3PEF is also compared to 2PEF: it generally gives a smaller degradation of the signal-to-background ratio (SBR) with depth, even if the emitted signal is smaller than with 2PEF.

== Development ==
After three-photon excited fluorescence was observed by Singh and Bradley and further validated by Hell, Chris Xu and Watt W. Webb reported measurement of excitation cross sections of several native chromophores and biological indicators, and implemented three-photon excited fluorescence in Laser Scanning Microscopy of living cells. In November 1996, David Wokosin applied three photon excitation fluorescence for fixed in vivo biological specimen imaging.

In 2010s, three photon microscopy was applied for deep tissue imaging using excitation wavelengths beyond 1060 nm. In January 2013, Horton, Wang, Kobat and Xu invented in vivo deep imaging of an intact mouse brain by employing point scanning method to three photon microscope at the long wavelength window of 1700 nm. In February 2017, Dimitre Ouzounov, Tainyu Wang, and Chris Xu demonstrated deep activity imaging of GCaMP6-labeled neurons in the hippocampus of an intact, adult mouse brain using three-photon microscopy at the 1300 nm wavelength window. In May 2017, Rowlands applied wide-field three-photon excitation to three photon microscope for larger penetration depth. In Oct 2018, T Wang, D Ouzounov, and C Xu were able to image vasculature and GCaMP6 calcium activity using three photon microscope through the intact mouse skull.

== Applications ==
Three-photon microscopy has similar application fields with two-photon excitation microscopy including neuroscience, and oncology. However, compared to standard single-photon or two-photon excitation, three-photon excitation has several benefits such as the use of longer wavelengths reduces the effects of light scattering and increasing the penetration depth of the illumination beam into the sample. The nonlinear nature of three photon microscopy confines the excitation target to a smaller volume, reducing out-of-focus light as well as minimizing photobleaching on the biological sample. These advantages of three-photon microscopy gives it an edge in visualize in vivo and ex vivo tissue morphology and physiology at a cellular level deep within scattering tissue and Rapid volumetric imaging. In the recent study, Xu has demonstrated the potential of three-photon imaging for noninvasive studies of live biological systems. The paper used three-photon fluorescence microscopy at a spectral excitation window of 1,320 nm to imaging the mouse brain structure and function through the intact skull with high spatial and temporal resolution(The lateral and axial FWHM was 0.96μm and 4.6μm) and large FOVs (hundreds of micrometers), and at substantial depth(>500 μm). This work demonstrates the advantage of higher-order nonlinear excitation for imaging through a highly scattering layer, in addition to the previously reported advantage of 3PM for deep imaging of densely labeled samples. Localized isomerization of photoswitchable drugs in vivo using three-photon excitation at 1560 nm has also been reported and used to control neuronal activity in a pharmacologically specific way.

== See also ==
- Laser scanning
- Nonlinear optics
- Two-photon excitation microscopy
