= Anterograde tracing =

Research method in neuroscience

Anterograde tracing is a research method that is used to trace axonal projections from the soma (cell body), to their point of termination at the synapse. A hallmark of anterograde tracing is the labeling of the presynaptic and the postsynaptic neurons. The crossing of the synaptic cleft is a vital difference between the anterograde tracers and the dye fillers used for morphological reconstruction. The complementary technique is retrograde tracing, which is used to trace neural connections from their termination at the synapse to their source at the cell body. Both anterograde and retrograde tracing techniques are based on the visualization of the biological process of axonal transport.

The anterograde and retrograde tracing techniques allow the detailed descriptions of neuronal projections from a single neuron, or from a defined population of neurons to their various targets throughout the nervous system. These techniques allow the "mapping" of connections between neurons in a particular structure such as the eye, and the target neurons in the brain. Much of what is known about connectional neuroanatomy was discovered through the use of the anterograde and retrograde tracing techniques.

== Techniques ==
Several methods exist to trace projections originating from the soma towards their target areas. These techniques initially relied upon the direct physical injection of various visualizable tracer molecules (e.g. green fluorescent protein, lipophylic dyes or radioactively tagged amino acids) into the brain. These molecules are absorbed locally by the soma (cell body) of various neurons and transported to the axon terminals, or they are absorbed by axons and transported to the soma of the neuron. Other tracer molecules allow for the visualization of large networks of axonal projections extending from the neurons exposed to the tracer.

Viral vectors have been developed and implemented as anterograde tracers to identify the target regions of projecting neurons.

Alternatively strategies are transsynaptic anterograde tracers, which can cross the synaptic cleft, labeling multiple neurons within a pathway. Those can also be genetic or molecular tracers.

Manganese-enhanced magnetic resonance imaging (MEMRI) has been used to trace functional circuits in living brains, as pioneered by Russ Jacobs, Robia Paultler, Alan Koretsky and Elaine Bearer. The Mn^{2+} ion gives a hyperintense signal in T_{1}-weighted MRI and thus serves as a contrast agent. Mn^{2+} enters through voltage dependent calcium channels, is taken into intracellular organelles and is transported by the endogenous neuronal transport system including kinesin-1, accumulating at distant locations. Statistical parametric mapping of Mn accumulation in time-lapse images provides detailed information not only about neuronal circuitry but also about the dynamics of transport within them, and the location of distal connections. This approach provides information about circuitry throughout the brain in living animals.

=== Genetic tracers ===
In order to trace projections from a specific region or cell, a genetic construct, virus or protein can be locally injected, after which it is allowed to be transported anterogradely. Viral tracers can cross the synapse, and can be used to trace connectivity between brain regions across many synapses. Examples of viruses used for anterograde tracing are described by Kuypers. Most well known are the herpes simplex virus type1 (HSV) and the rhabdoviruses. HSV was used to trace the connections between the brain and the stomach, in order to examine the brain areas involved in viscero-sensory processing. Another study used HSV type1 and type2 to investigate the optical pathway: by injecting the virus into the eye, the pathway from the retina into the brain was visualized.

Viral tracers use a receptor on the host cell to attach to it and are then endocytosed. For example, HSV uses the nectin receptor and is then endocytosed. After endocytosis, the low pH inside the vesicle strips the envelope of the virion after which the virus is ready to be transported to the cell body. It was shown that pH and endocytosis are crucial for the HSV to infect a cell. Transport of the viral particles along the axon was shown to depend on the microtubular cytoskeleton.

=== Molecular tracers ===
There is also a group of tracers that consist of protein products that can be taken up by the cell and transported across the synapse into the next cell. Wheat-germ agglutinin (WGA) and Phaseolus vulgaris leucoagglutinin are the most well known tracers, however they are not strict anterograde tracers: especially WGA is known to be transported anterogradely as well as retrogradely. WGA enters the cell by binding to oligosaccharides, and is then taken up via endocytosis via a caveolae-dependent pathway.

Other anterograde tracers widely used in neuroanatomy are the biotinylated dextran amines (BDAs), also used in retrograde tracing.

== Partial list of studies using this technique ==
The anterograde tracing technique is now a widespread research technique. The following are a partial list of studies that have used anterograde tracing techniques:

- Talay, M., Richman, E. B., Snell, N. J., Hartmann, G. G., Fisher, J. D., Sorkaç, A., Santoyo, J. F., Chou-Freed, C., Nair, N., Johnson, M., Szymanski, J. R., & Barnea, G. (November 2017). Transsynaptic Mapping of Second-Order Taste Neurons in Flies by trans-Tango. Neuron, 96(4), 783–795.e4. https://doi.org/10.1016/j.neuron.2017.10.011
- Deller T, Naumann T, Frotscher M (November 2000). "Retrograde and anterograde tracing combined with transmitter identification and electron microscopy". Journal of Neuroscience Methods. 103 (1): 117–26. doi:10.1016/S0165-0270(00)00301-0. PMID 11074101. S2CID 13534170.
- Kressel M (April 1998). "Tyramide amplification allows anterograde tracing by horseradish peroxidase-conjugated lectins in conjunction with simultaneous immunohistochemistry". The Journal of Histochemistry and Cytochemistry. 46 (4): 527–33. doi:10.1177/002215549804600413. PMID 9575040. S2CID 17642689.
- Haberl MG, Viana da Silva S, Guest JM, Ginger M, Ghanem A, Mulle C, Oberlaender M, Conzelmann KK, Frick A (Apr 2014). "An anterograde rabies virus vector for high-resolution large-scale reconstruction of 3D neuron morphology". Brain Structure & Function. 220 (3): 1369–79. doi:10.1007/s00429-014-0730-z. PMC 4409643. PMID 24723034.
- Chamberlin NL, Du B, de Lacalle S, Saper CB (May 1998). "Recombinant adeno-associated virus vector: use for transgene expression and anterograde tract tracing in the CNS". Brain Research. 793 (1–2): 169–75. doi:10.1016/s0006-8993(98)00169-3. PMC 4961038. PMID 9630611.
- Luppi PH, Fort P, Jouvet M (November 1990). "Iontophoretic application of unconjugated cholera toxin B subunit (CTb) combined with immunohistochemistry of neurochemical substances: a method for transmitter identification of retrogradely labeled neurons". Brain Research. 534 (1–2): 209–24. doi:10.1016/0006-8993(90)90131-T. PMID 1705851. S2CID 25326054.

== See also ==
- Retrograde tracing
- Viral neuronal tracing
