= Two-photon excitation microscopy =

Fluorescence imaging technique

Volumetric two-photon calcium imaging of 852 neurons in awake mouse brain. The imaged volume spans 1400×1900×460µm³, sampled at 30 volumes per second.

Volumetric two-photon imaging of FITC-labeled microvessels in awake mouse brain. The depth-color-coded imaged volume spans 540×550×510µm³, sampled at 30 volumes per second.

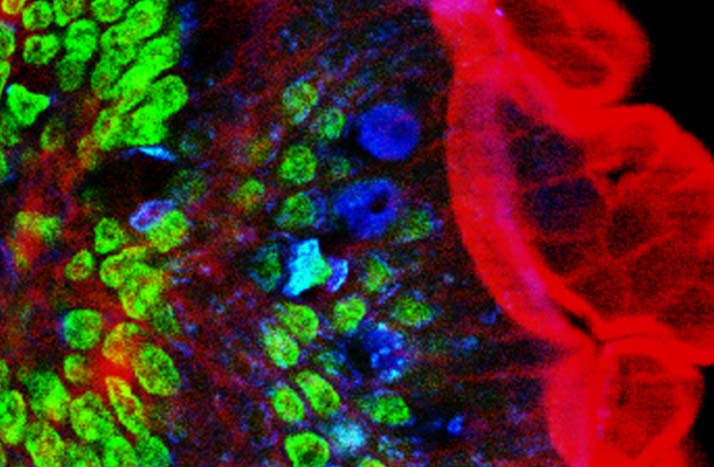
Two-photon excitation microscopy of mouse intestine. Red: actin. Green: cell nuclei. Blue: mucus of goblet cells. Obtained at 780 nm using a Ti-sapphire laser.

Two-photon excitation microscopy (TPEF or 2PEF) is a fluorescence imaging technique that is particularly well-suited to image scattering living tissue of up to about one millimeter in thickness. Unlike traditional fluorescence microscopy, where the excitation wavelength is shorter than the emission wavelength, two-photon excitation requires simultaneous excitation by two photons with longer wavelength than the emitted light. The laser is focused onto a specific location in the tissue and scanned across the sample to sequentially produce the image. Due to the non-linearity of two-photon excitation, mainly fluorophores in the micrometer-sized focus of the laser beam are excited, which results in the spatial resolution of the image. This contrasts with confocal microscopy, where the spatial resolution is produced by the interaction of excitation focus and the confined detection with a pinhole.

Two-photon excitation microscopy typically uses near-infrared (NIR) excitation light which can also excite fluorescent dyes. Using infrared light minimizes scattering in the tissue because infrared light is scattered less in typical biological tissues. Due to the multiphoton absorption, the background signal is strongly suppressed. Both effects lead to an increased penetration depth for this technique. Two-photon excitation can be a superior alternative to confocal microscopy due to its deeper tissue penetration, efficient light detection, and reduced photobleaching.

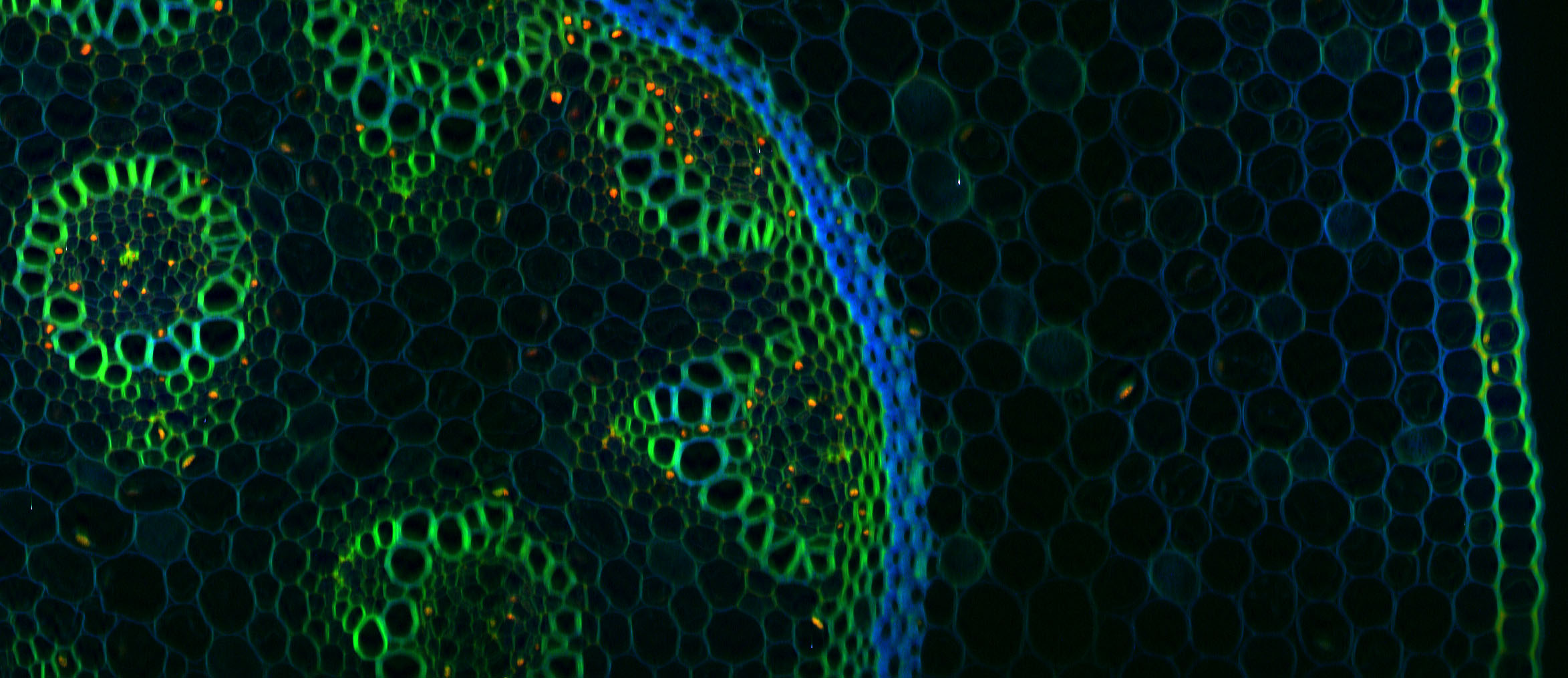
Two-photon fluorescence image of a stained cross section of a lily of the valley rhizome. The excitement is at 840 nm, and the red and blue colors represent other channels of multiphoton techniques which have been superimposed.

== Concept ==
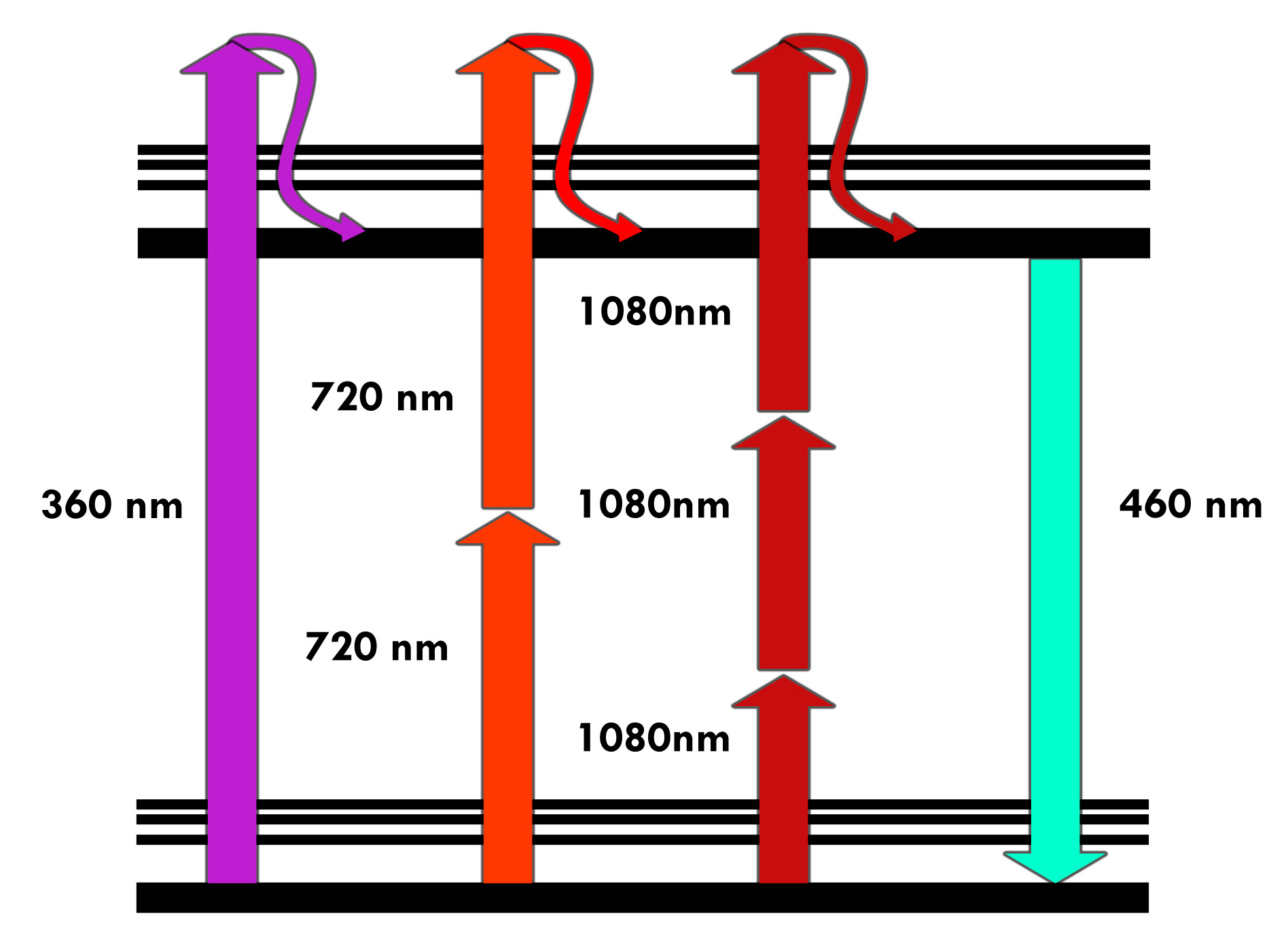
Schematic representation of the energy levels (Jabłoński diagrams) of the fluorescence process, example of a fluorescent dye that emits light at 460 nm. One (purple, 1PEF), two (light red, 2PEF) or three (dark red, 3PEF) photons are absorbed to emit a photon of fluorescence (turquoise).

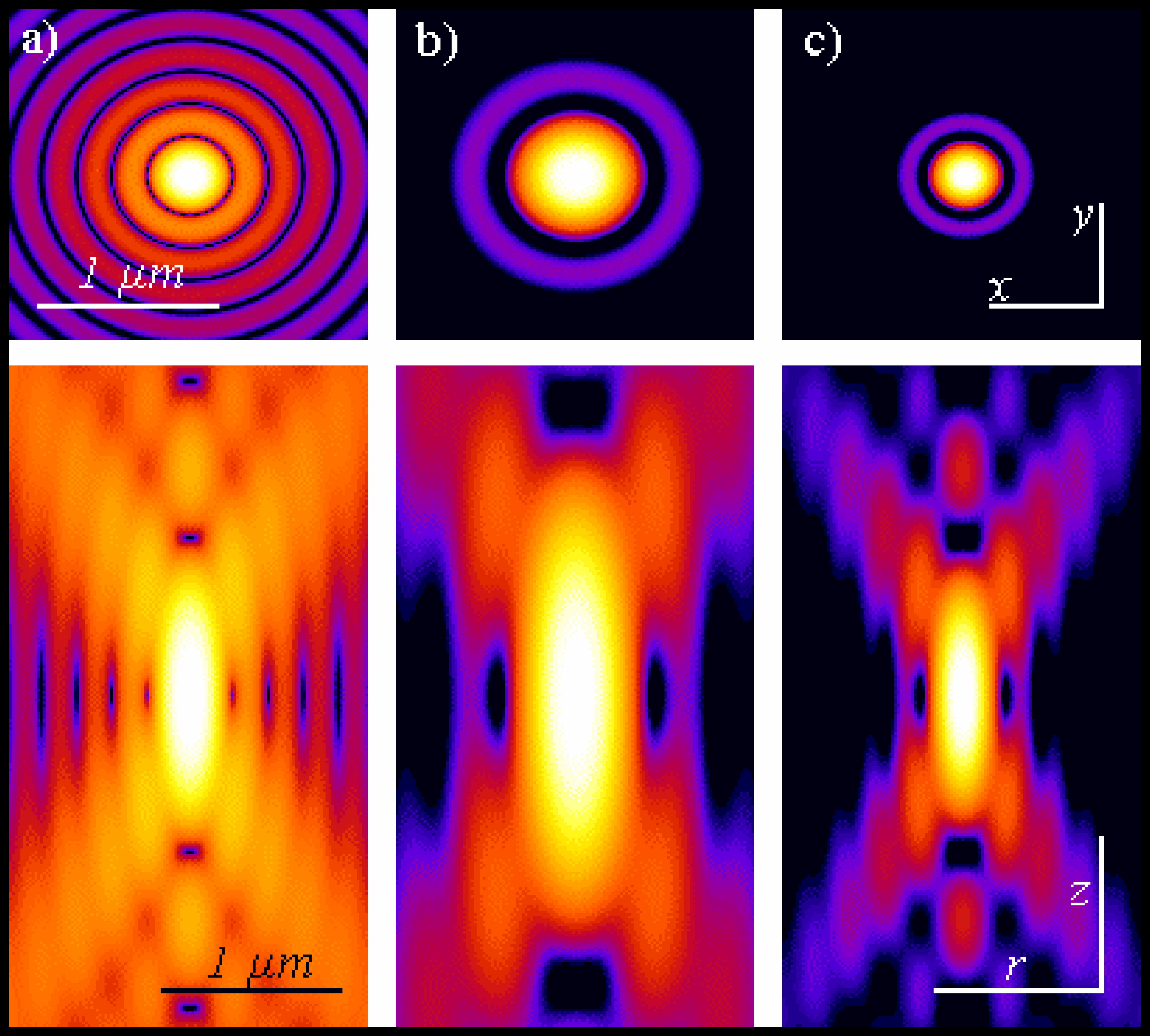
Optical response from a point source. From left to right: calculated intensity distributions xy (top) and rz (bottom), with logarithmic scale, for a point source imaged by means of a wide field (a), 2PEF (b) and confocal microscopy (c). The 2PEF and confocal forms have a better signal-to-noise ratio than the wide field. The 2PEF distribution is larger due to the fact that a wavelength twice as long as in the case of a wide or confocal field is responsible for the intensity distribution. These intensity distributions are also known as point spread functions. Optical conditions: the excitation wavelengths are 488 nm and 900 nm respectively for 1PEF and 2PEF; the emission wavelength is 520 nm; the numerical aperture is 1.3 with an oil immersion objective.

Two-photon excitation employs two-photon absorption, a concept first described by Maria Goeppert Mayer (1906–1972) in her doctoral dissertation in 1931, and first observed in 1961 in a CaF_{2}:Eu^{2+} crystal using laser excitation by Wolfgang Kaiser. Isaac Abella showed in 1962 in caesium vapor that two-photon excitation of single atoms is possible.

Two-photon excitation fluorescence microscopy has similarities to other confocal laser microscopy techniques such as laser scanning confocal microscopy and Raman microscopy. These techniques use focused laser beams scanned in a raster pattern to generate images, and both have an optical sectioning effect. Unlike confocal microscopes, multiphoton microscopes do not contain pinhole apertures that give confocal microscopes their optical sectioning quality. The optical sectioning produced by multiphoton microscopes is a result of the point spread function of the excitation.

The concept of two-photon excitation is based on the idea that two photons, of comparably lower photon energy than needed for one-photon excitation, can also excite a fluorophore in one quantum event. Each photon carries approximately half the energy necessary to excite the molecule. The emitted photon is at a higher energy (shorter wavelength) than either of the two exciting photons. The probability of the near-simultaneous absorption of two photons is extremely low. Therefore, a high peak flux of excitation photons is typically required, usually generated by femtosecond pulsed laser. For example, the same average laser power but without pulsing results in no detectable fluorescence compared to fluorescence generated by the pulsed laser via the two-photon effect.

The longer wavelength, lower energy (typically infrared) excitation lasers of multiphoton microscopes are well-suited to use in imaging live cells as they cause less damage than the short-wavelength lasers typically used for single-photon excitation, so living tissues may be observed for longer periods with fewer toxic effects.

The most commonly used fluorophores have excitation spectra in the 400–500 nm range, whereas the laser used to excite the two-photon fluorescence lies in the ~700–1100 nm (infrared) range produced by Ti-sapphire lasers. If the fluorophore absorbs two infrared photons simultaneously, it will absorb enough energy to be raised into the excited state. The fluorophore will then emit a single photon with a wavelength that depends on the type of fluorophore used (typically in the visible spectrum). Because two photons are absorbed during the excitation of the fluorophore, the probability of fluorescent emission from the fluorophores increases quadratically with the excitation intensity. Therefore, much more two-photon fluorescence is generated where the laser beam is tightly focused than where it is more diffuse. Effectively, excitation is restricted to the tiny focal volume (~1 femtoliter), resulting in a high degree of rejection of out-of-focus objects. This localization of excitation is the key advantage compared to single-photon excitation microscopes, which need to employ elements such as pinholes to reject out-of-focus fluorescence. The fluorescence from the sample is then collected by a high-sensitivity detector, such as a photomultiplier tube. This observed light intensity becomes one pixel in the eventual image; the focal point is scanned throughout a desired region of the sample to form all the pixels of the image.

== Development ==
A diagram of a two-photon microscope.

Two-photon microscopy was pioneered and patented by Winfried Denk and James Strickler in the lab of Watt W. Webb at Cornell University in 1990. They combined the idea of two-photon absorption with the use of a laser scanner. In two-photon excitation microscopy an infrared laser beam is focused through an objective lens. The Ti-sapphire laser normally used has a pulse width of approximately 100 femtoseconds (fs) and a repetition rate of about 80 MHz, allowing the high photon density and flux required for two-photon absorption, and is tunable across a wide range of wavelengths.

The use of infrared light to excite fluorophores in light-scattering tissue has added benefits. Longer wavelengths are scattered to a lesser degree than shorter ones, which is a benefit to high-resolution imaging. In addition, these lower-energy photons are less likely to cause damage outside the focal volume. Compared to a confocal microscope, photon detection is much more effective since even scattered photons contribute to the usable signal. These benefits for imaging in scattering tissues were only recognized several years after the invention of two-photon excitation microscopy.

There are several caveats to using two-photon microscopy: The pulsed lasers needed for two-photon excitation are much more expensive than the continuous wave (CW) lasers used in confocal microscopy. The two-photon absorption spectrum of a molecule may vary significantly from its one-photon counterpart. Higher-order photodamage becomes a problem and bleaching scales with the square of the laser power, whereas it is linear for single-photon (confocal). For very thin objects such as isolated cells, single-photon (confocal) microscopes can produce images with higher optical resolution due to their shorter excitation wavelengths. In scattering tissue, on the other hand, the superior optical sectioning and light detection capabilities of the two-photon microscope result in better performance.

== Applications ==
=== Main ===
Two-photon microscopy has been involved in numerous fields including: physiology, neurobiology, embryology and tissue engineering. Even thin, nearly transparent tissues (such as skin cells) have been visualized with clear detail due to this technique. Two-photon microscopy's high speed imaging capabilities may also be utilized in noninvasive optical biopsy. Two-photon microscopy has been aptly used for producing localized chemical reactions, an effect that has been used also for two-photon-based lithography, and localized photoisomerization in photopharmacology. Using two-photon fluorescence and second-harmonic generation–based microscopy, it was shown that organic porphyrin-type molecules can have different transition dipole moments for two-photon fluorescence and second harmonic generation, which are otherwise thought to occur from the same transition dipole moment. Non-degenerative two-photon excitation, or using 2 photons of unequal wavelengths, was shown to increase the fluorescence of all tested small molecules and fluorescent proteins.

=== Cancer research ===
2PEF was also proven to be very valuable for characterizing skin cancer, It had also been shown to reveal tumor cell arrest, tumor cell-platelet interaction, tumor cell-leukocyte interaction and metastatic colonization processes.

=== Embryonic research ===
2PEF has shown to be advantageous over other techniques, such as confocal microscopy when it comes to long-term live-cell imaging of mammalian embryos.

=== Kidney research ===
2PEF has also been used in visualization of difficult-to-access cell types, especially in regards to kidney cells. It has been used in better understanding fluid dynamics and filtration.

=== Viral infection level determination ===
2PEF was also proven to be valuable tool for monitoring correlates of viral (SARS-CoV-2) infection in cell culture using a 2P-active Ca^{2+} sensitive dye.

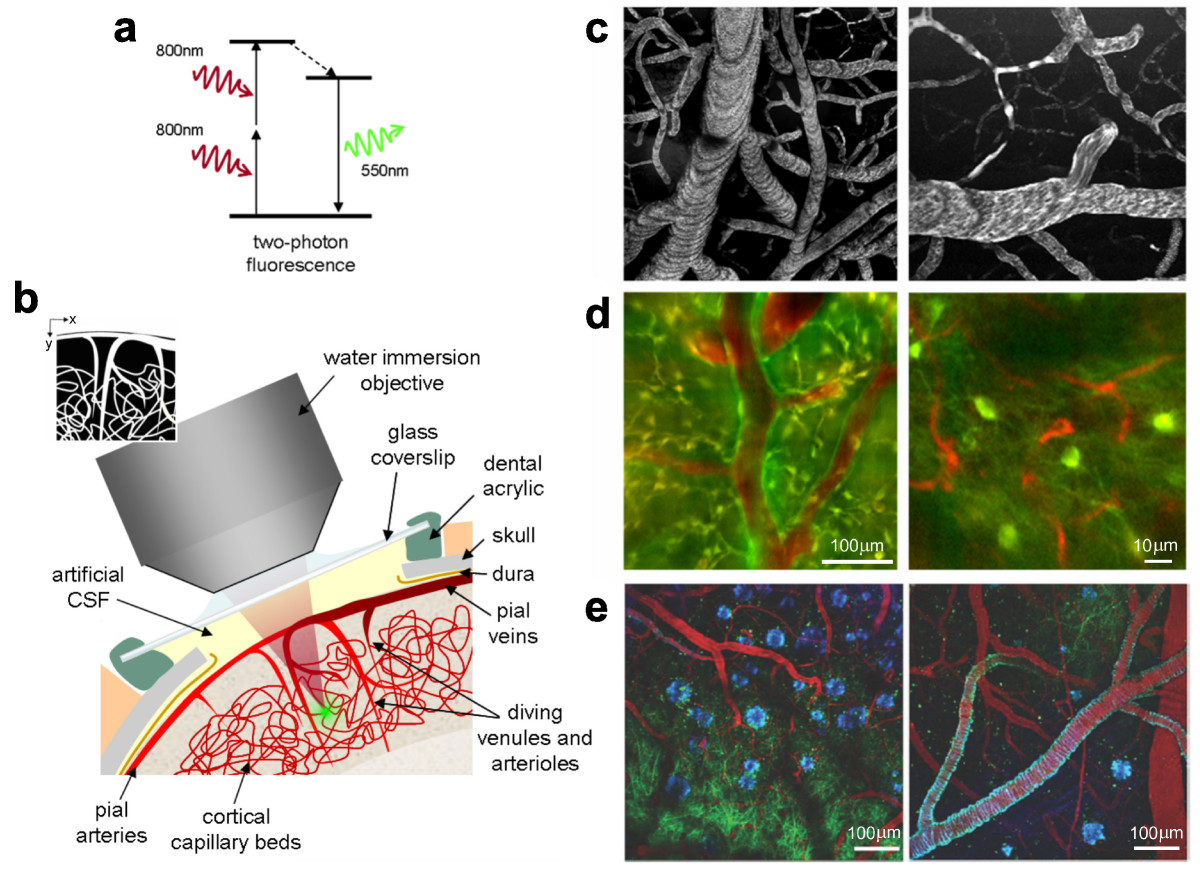
Diagram of in vivo brain function imaging. Shows the general schematic for imaging, along with neuronal and vascular images. Imaging was performed using various fluorescent dyes.

=== Neuroscience ===
2PEF as well as the extension of this method to 3PEF are used to characterize intact neural tissues in the brain of living and even behaving animals. In particular, the method is advantageous for calcium imaging of a neuron or populations of neurons, for photopharmacology including localized uncaging of components such as glutamate, GABA or isomerization of photoswitchable drugs, and for the imaging of other genetically encoded sensors that report the concentration of neurotransmitters.

Currently, two-photon microscopy is widely used to image the live firing of neurons in model organisms including fruit flies (Drosophila melanogaster), rats, songbirds, primates, ferrets, mice (Mus musculus), zebrafish. The animals are typically head-fixed due to the size of the microscope and scan devices, but also miniatured microscopes are being developed that enable imaging of neurons in the moving and freely behaving animals.

== Higher-order excitation ==
Simultaneous absorption of three or more photons is also possible, allowing for higher-order multiphoton excitation microscopy. So-called "three-photon excitation fluorescence microscopy" (3PEF) is the most used technique after 2PEF, to which it is complementary. Localized isomerization of photoswitchable drugs in vivo using three-photon excitation has also been reported.

== Dyes and fluorescent proteins for two-photon excitation microscopy ==
In general, all commonly used fluorescent proteins (CFP, GFP, YFP, RFP) and dyes can be excited in two-photon mode. Two-photon excitation spectra are often considerably broader, making it more difficult to excite fluorophores selectively by switching excitation wavelengths.

Several green, red and NIR emitting dyes (probes and reactive labels) with extremely high 2-photon absorption cross-sections have been reported. Due to the donor-acceptor-donor type structure, squaraine dyes such as Seta-670, Seta-700 and Seta-660 exhibit very high 2-photon absorption (2PA) efficiencies in comparison to other dyes, SeTau-647 and SeTau-665, a new type of squaraine-rotaxane, exhibit extremely high two-photon action cross-sections of up to 10,000 GM in the near IR region, unsurpassed by any other class of organic dyes.

== See also ==
- 3D optical data storage
- Nonlinear optics
- Second-harmonic imaging microscopy
- Three-photon microscopy
- Two-photon absorption
- Two-photon photoelectron spectroscopy
- Wide-field multiphoton microscopy

== Sources ==
- Schmitt, Michael; Mayerhöfer, Thomas; Popp, Jürgen; Kleppe, Ingo; Weisshart, Klaus (2013). "Light-Matter Interaction". Handbook of Biophotonics. doi:10.1002/9783527643981.bphot003. ISBN 978-3-527-64398-1. S2CID 93908151.
- König, Karsten (2018). Multiphoton Microscopy and Fluorescence Lifetime Imaging: Applications in Biology and Medicine. Walter de Gruyter GmbH & Co KG. ISBN 978-3-11-042998-5.
- Keikhosravi, Adib; Bredfeldt, Jeremy S.; Sagar, Abdul Kader; Eliceiri, Kevin W. (2014). "Second-harmonic generation imaging of cancer". Quantitative Imaging in Cell Biology. Methods in Cell Biology. Vol. 123. pp. 531–546. doi:10.1016/B978-0-12-420138-5.00028-8. ISBN 978-0-12-420138-5. PMID 24974046.
- Yu, Hanry; Rahim, Nur Aida Abdul (2013). Imaging in Cellular and Tissue Engineering. CRC Press. ISBN 978-1-4398-4804-3.
