= Retrograde tracing =

Technique for mapping neural circuits in the "upstream" direction, from target to source

PVH neurons of Long-Evans rat marked with retrograde tracer fluoro-gold

Retrograde tracing is a research method used in neuroscience to trace neural connections from their point of termination (the synapse) to their source (the cell body). Retrograde tracing techniques allow for detailed assessment of neuronal connections between a target population of neurons and their inputs throughout the nervous system. These techniques allow the "mapping" of connections between neurons in a particular structure (e.g. the eye) and the target neurons in the brain. The opposite technique is anterograde tracing, which is used to trace neural connections from their source to their point of termination (i.e. from cell body to synapse). Both the anterograde and retrograde tracing techniques are based on the visualization of axonal transport.

== Techniques ==
Retrograde tracing can be achieved through various means, including the use of viral strains as markers of a cell's connectivity to the injection site. The pseudorabies virus (PRV; Bartha strain), for example, may be used as a suitable tracer due to the propensity of the infection to spread upstream through a pathway of synaptically linked neurons, thus revealing the nature of their circuitry.

Rabies has been shown to be effective for this system of circuit tracing because of its low level of damage to infected cells, specificity of infecting only neurons, and strict limitation of viral spread between neurons to synaptic regions. These factors allow for highly specific traces that can reveal individual neuronal connections in a circuit without inflicting physical damage on the cells.

Another technique involves injecting special "beads" into the brain nuclei of anaesthetized animals. The animals are allowed to survive for a few days and then euthanized. The cells in the origin of projection are visualized through an inverted fluorescence microscope.

A specialist technique was developed by Wickersham and colleagues, which employed a modified rabies virus. This virus was capable of infecting a single cell and jumping across one synapse; this allowed the researchers to investigate the local connectivity of neurons.

=== Rabies virus ===
After being taken up at the synaptic terminal or axon of the target neuron, the rabies virus is enveloped in a vesicle which is transported towards the cell body via axonal dynein. In the wildtype rabies virus, the virus will continue to replicate and spread throughout the central nervous system until it has systemically infected the entire brain. Deletion of the gene encoding glycoprotein (G protein) in rabies limits the spread of the virus strictly to cells that were initially infected. Transsynaptic spread of the virus can be limited to monosynaptic transmission to a neuron of origin by pseudotyping the G protein and putting the gene under Cre-control. This viral spread can be visualized through methods including addition of a fluorescence gene such as green fluorescent protein onto the viral cassette or through immunohistochemistry.

=== Pseudorabies virus ===
A member of the herpesviridae family, the pseudorabies virus spreads through the CNS in both a retrograde and anterograde fashion, moving up the neural axon into the soma and dendrites in the retrograde application. Deletion of three key membrane protein genes in the PRV-Bartha strain of pseudorabies blocks anterograde spread of the virus and allows for additional manipulations to the viral DNA such as fluorescence to be added, allowing for retrograde circuit tracing.

=== Fluoro-Gold ===
Fluoro-Gold, also known as hydroxystilbamidine, is a non-viral fluorescent retrograde tracer whose movement up the axon and across the dendritic tree can be visualized via fluorescent microscopy or immunohistochemistry.

== See also ==
- Anterograde tracing
- Neural pathway
- Viral neuronal tracing
