= Ilham =

Ilham (إلهام) is a unisex name that derives from the Arabic word for inspiration. It is usually a given name, rarely used as a surname. Pronounced Arabic: [ʔɪlˈhæːm, ʔelˈhæːm, ʔɪlˈhɑːm], Persian: [elˈhɒːm]. Notable people with the name include:

== As a given name ==
- Ilham Aliyev (born 1961), President of Azerbaijan since 2003
- Ilham al-Madfai (born c. 1942), Iraqi guitarist, singer and composer
- Ilham Chahine (born 1961), Egyptian actress
- Ilham Ghali of Kazan (c. 1449 – c. 1490), khan of Kazan Khanate
- Ilham Hussain (born 1955), wife of Dr. Mohammed Waheed Hassan
- Ilham Jaya Kesuma (born 1978), Indonesian footballer
- Ilham Kadri (born 1969), Moroccan business executive and current CEO of Syensqo, formerly Solvay
- Ilham Moussaïd, French politician
- Ilham Naghiyev (born 1988), Azerbaijani economist
- Ilham Tohti (born 1969), Uyghur economist serving a life sentence in China, on separatism-related charges
- Ilham Yadullayev (born 1975), Azerbaijani footballer
- Ilham Zakiyev (born 1980), Azerbaijani judo practitioner

== As a surname ==
- Muhammad Ilham (born 1981), Indonesian footballer
