= Melike Lakadamyali =

Cypriot physicist

- Education: University of Texas at Austin (BSc), Harvard University (PhD)
- Known for: Super-Resolution Microscopy; Single Molecule Biophysics
- Scientific career
- Fields: Super-Resolution Microscopy; Single Molecule Biophysics
- Workplaces: Harvard University; ICFO - The Institute of Photonic Sciences; University of Pennsylvania
- Thesis: Real-time Imaging of Viral Infection and Intracellular Transport in Live Cells (2006)
- Academic advisors: Xiaowei Zhuang; Jeff Lichtman
- Website: Lakadamyali Lab

Melike Lakadamyali is a Cypriot physicist and a Full Professor of Physiology and of Cell and Developmental Biology (secondary) at the University of Pennsylvania in Philadelphia, renowned for her work in super-resolution microscopy and Single Molecule Biophysics. She is the Group Leader of the Lakadamyali Lab.

== Education ==
From 1997 to 2001, Lakadamyali studied Physics at the University of Texas at Austin, USA. During the end of her university time, she gained some practical experience by working in the labs of Prof. Ken Shih and Prof. Josef A. Käs. From 2001 to 2006, she earned her Ph.D. in Physics at Harvard University, Cambridge, MA, USA, advised by Prof Xiaowei Zhuang, focusing on the visualization of viral infection and intracellular transport in live cells.

== Career and research ==
For her postgraduate work, Lakadamyali worked as a postdoctoral researcher under Prof Jeff Lichtman at the Center for Brain Science at Harvard University, MA, USA.

Between 2010 and 2016, Lakadamyali was a Group Leader at ICFO - The Institute of Photonic Sciences in Barcelona, Spain, holding a Junior (2010-2015) and Senior (2015-2016) Group Leader position, respectively. Her group's superresolution microscopy study investigating the genome gained widespread attention. It reveals that our genome needs to be regularly packaged and links these packaging differences to stem cell state.

In 2017, Lakadamyali returned to the United States to work as an Assistant Professor of Physiology and of Cell and Developmental Biology (secondary) at the University of Pennsylvania in Philadelphia.

In 2020, Lakadamyali was promoted to Associate Professor of Physiology and in 2024 she was promoted to Full Professor.

Lakadamyali's area of research is focused on examining biology at the level of its macromolecular machines. She aims to obtain a quantitative and biophysical comprehension of how these machines propel critical cell biological processes. Hence, she is also involved in designing sophisticated microscopy techniques that strive to surmount the current limitations of existing methods, thereby enabling them to observe the macromolecular machinery of the cell in motion with superior spatiotemporal resolution.

Lakadamyali is a microscopist and biophysicist. She is invited to speak at workshops and conferences in the field.

Since 2019, Lakadamyali has been a Reviewing Editor (Cell Biology) at eLife.

== Awards and honours ==
- 1997 Cyprus-America-Scholarship Program and Fulbright Commission scholar
- 2013 EMBO Young Investigator Award
- 2013 ERC Starting Grant - MOTORS Grant
- 2017 Profiled in "Cell Scientist to Watch," Journal of Cell Science
- 2017 Profiled in "Author File," Nature Methods
