= Syensqo =

Belgian advanced materials company

Syensqo SA
- Type: Public
- Traded as: Euronext Brussels: SYENS; BEL 20 component
- ISIN: BE0974464977
- Industry: Chemicals
- Founded: December 2023; 2 years ago
- Headquarters: Brussels, Belgium
- Area served: Worldwide
- Key people: Mike Radossich (CEO); Heike Van de Kerkhof (Chair)
- Products: Specialty polymers, composites and specialty chemicals
- Revenue: € 5,969 million (2025)
- Operating income: 195,000,000 euro (2025)
- Net income: −60,000,000 euro (2025)
- Total assets: 11,504,000,000 euro (2025)
- Number of employees: 13,000 (2025)
- Website: www.syensqo.com

Syensqo (pronounced “Science Co”) is a Belgian multinational chemicals and advanced materials company, headquartered in Brussels, Belgium. It was established in December 2023, through the spin-off from Solvay. The current CEO is Mike Radossich, who succeeded Ilham Kadri in January 2026.

Syensqo has been publicly listed since December 11, 2023 and joined the BEL20 soon after. The company is present globally with 54 industrial sites and 12 major R&D centers, and it employs 13,000 people in 30 countries.

== History ==
In 2022, Solvay announced the intention to separate into two independent stock listed companies: Solvay and Syensqo.

Solvay would retain its historic soda ash, Peroxides, Silica, and Coatis production, as well as the Specialty Chemicals division. The Materials, Composites, and Solutions divisions were split off into Syensqo. The goal of separating the two companies was to give independence and flexibility in pursuing different strategies.

The name Syensqo is explained as follows: SY represents the first and last letters in Solvay. EN is a nod to Solvay’s founder, Ernest Solvay. SYENS refers to Solvay’s scientific heritage, which goes back to 1911, when Ernest Solvay brought 24 scientists together for the first Solvay Conference. Q refers to quantum physics, which was discussed at the conference. QO is for company.

On Friday, December 8, 2023, shareholders approved the plan to split Solvay into two separate entities. As a result, Ilham Kadri, former CEO of Solvay, became the CEO of Syensqo, whereas Philippe Kehren became the CEO of Solvay.

The split became effective on December 11th, 2023, with shares listed on Euronext Brussels and Euronext Paris. On September 16, 2024 Syensqo announced its intention to delist from Euronext Paris.

== Operations ==
Syensqo researches and produces advanced materials for use in both industrial and consumer applications. Its businesses include specialty polymers, composites, surfactants, aroma, technology solutions, as well as growth platforms in batteries, green hydrogen, thermoplastic composites, renewable materials, and biotechnology.

=== Business segments ===
Syensqo’s activities are organized into two primary business segments: Materials and Performance & Care.

Materials
This segment develops high-performance materials for industries such as aerospace, automotive and transportation, electronics and healthcare. It is divided into two sub-segments: Composite materials and Specialty polymers.
The composite materials sub-segment includes thermoset and thermoplastic composites, carbon fiber prepregs, resin systems, and adhesives used in aerospace, automotive and energy applications.
The specialty polymers sub-segment comprises high-performance plastics designed for heat and chemical resistance. It includes fluoropolymers, fluoroelastomers, fluorinated fluids, semi-aromatic polyamides, sulfone polymers, ultra-high performance aromatic polymers, high-barrier polymers, polymer stabilizers and solvents used in automotive, electronics and industrial applications.

Performance & Care
This segment produces specialty chemicals, such as surfactants, natural and synthetic polymers, solvents, and additives. These products are used primarily in the consumer care, agriculture, mining, and coatings markets.

=== Products ===
Syensqo produces a range of materials and specialty chemicals used in industrial, consumer, and energy-related applications.

Specialty polymers and fluoropolymers
Syensqo manufactures polymers designed for applications requiring thermal stability, mechanical strength, and chemical resistance. These include polyarylsulfones and other high-purity polymers used in filtration systems, medical technologies, and processing environments.
Its portfolio includes polysulfone-based materials, polyamides, liquid-crystal polymers, and polyaryletherketones such as PEEK and PEKK, as well as barrier polymers (PVDC) used in packaging and industrial applications.
The company also produces fluoropolymers (PVDF, ECTFE, PTFE), as well as fluoroelastomers (FKM) and perfluoroelastomers (FFKM), which are used in industries such as electronics, energy, chemical processing, and semiconductor manufacturing. It has also introduced fluorinated elastomers manufactured without certain fluorosurfactants associated with PFAS chemistry. Additional materials include fluorinated fluids (PFPE), used in lubrication and heat-transfer applications.
Other products include perfluorosulfonic acid (PFSA) ionomers used as ion-conducting materials in electrochemical technologies such as fuel cells and water electrolysis, as well as electroactive polymers (EAP) used in sensors, actuators, and related devices.

Composite materials
Syensqo produces composite materials, including carbon fiber, resin systems, and adhesives used in aerospace, automotive, and industrial applications.
These include thermoset and thermoplastic composites, including pre-impregnated materials (prepregs), as well as carbon fibers, resin formulations, and bonding materials such as adhesive films and pastes.
The company also supplies materials for surface treatments and lightning strike protection in composite structures used in aircraft and other applications. These materials are used in the manufacture of lightweight structural components in sectors such as aerospace, automotive and transportation, and industry, including airframe structures, propulsion systems, and related components.

Specialty chemicals
Syensqo supplies specialty chemical ingredients used mainly in consumer care, mining, coatings, and agricultural applications.
These include ingredients derived from renewable feedstocks that are used in home and personal care formulations, as well as reagents used in the recovery and separation of metals such as lithium, nickel, and cobalt.
The company also produces additives, monomers, solvents, and emulsifiers used in paints, coatings, and adhesives. In addition, it supplies formulation aids and adjuvants used in agricultural applications, including crop protection, seed treatment, and related formulations.

Bio-based and circular materials
Syensqo develops materials formulated with renewable or recycled feedstocks. These include polymers, composite materials and surfactants incorporating bio-based or recycled content used in applications such as consumer care, electronics, automotive, transportation, and industrial applications.

== Locations and manufacturing facilities ==
Syensqo’s headquarters is located in Brussels, Belgium. As of late 2025, the company operates 54 industrial sites and 12 major research and innovation (R&I) centers across 30 countries.

Americas
Syensqo operates 26 production sites and 9 R&I centers across the Americas, with major facilities located in the United States and Canada. In the United States, sites include Orange and Anaheim (California), Winona (Minnesota), Marietta (Ohio), Mount Pleasant (Tennessee), Alpharetta and Winder (Georgia), as well as a facility in Augusta, Georgia, supporting materials used in electric‑vehicle battery applications. In Canada, operations include facilities in Welland, Niagara Falls, Ontario.

Europe
European operations are primarily concentrated in France, Italy, and Germany.
In France, the company maintains facilities in Tavaux, Clamecy, and Melle, covering advanced polymer activities and the production of ingredients for consumer applications, including personal and home care.
In Italy, operations include sites in Spinetta Marengo and Bollate, associated with specialty polymers and high‑performance fluids, and Ospiate for consumer applications, while facilities in Heanor and Wrexham are used for advanced and composite materials activities in the United Kingdom.

Asia-Pacific
In the Asia-Pacific region, Syensqo operates production sites and R&I centers mainly across China, India, and South Korea.
In China, a major R&I center is based in Shanghai, while major facilities include Changshu, which supports high‑performance fluoropolymer production, and Zhenjiang, which serves consumer applications.

== Leadership ==
The company is led by an executive leadership team and overseen by a board of directors.

Executive Leadership Team

- Mike Radossich - CEO
- Christopher Davis - CFO
- Brian Belanger - General Counsel
- Kerstin Artenberg - Chief People Officer
- Arnaud Valenduc - President, Specialty Polymers

Boards of Directors

- Heike Van De Kerkhof - Chair of the Board (appointed March 2026)
- Mike Radossich - CEO
- Françoise de Viron - Vice-Chair of the Board
- Edouard Janssen
- Mary Meaney
- Thomas Bucher
- Miguel Mantas
- Martine Snels
- Augusto Di Donfrancesco
- Cynthia Arnold

== Other activities ==
In addition to its diverse businesses, Syensqo is actively engaged in partnerships and research projects.

In January 2024, Syensqo became a sponsor of DS Penske, sealing a partnership with the Formula E racing team that concluded in November 2026.

From May 2024, Syensqo as main partner, together with Mohammed VI Polytechnic University and OCP Group, is involved in the Climate Impulse project, which aims to set a historic precedent by flying a green hydrogen aircraft around the world by 2028. The aircraft will attempt to fly nine days non-stop all around the Equator with pilots Bertrand Piccard, who was also involved in the Solar Impulse project, and Raphaël Dinelli.

In June 2024, Syensqo announced the nomination of a new Scientific Advisory Board for its innovation projects, which sees the participation of four important academics in the field of chemistry: Ben Feringa (Nobel Prize in Chemistry in 2016), Avelino Corma, Karim Zaghib, and Juan de Pablo.

Syensqo also recognizes scientific advancements and major discoveries through the Science for the Future Ernest Solvay Prize by Syensqo, previously known as the Solvay Prize. With the support of the Syensqo Fund, the prize is awarded to individuals who have made significant contributions in the field of chemistry. The recipient of the 2026 prize is Xiaowei Zhuang, Professor of Science at Harvard University and Investigator at the Howard Hughes Medical Institute, for her work in advanced molecular and cellular imaging.
Previous prize laureates include scientists such as Peter G. Schultz (2013), Ben Feringa (2015), Susumu Kitagawa (2017), Carolyn Bertozzi (2020), Katalin Karikó (2022) and Omar Yaghi (2024), some of whom have also received Nobel Prizes.

== Controversies ==
Syensqo produces a piece of the "Hermes 450" drone in its UK factory, for UAV Tactical Systems (a company co-owned by the Israeli Elbits Systems Ltd and the French Thales). The drone model was that used by Israel in the bombing of humanitarian workers from the NGO World Central Kitchen in Gaza, on April 1, 2024.

In June 2025, activists blocked Syensqo headquarters in Brussels to demand the respect of the military embargo towards Israel (in place since 2009 in Belgium). “We make no secret of the fact that we are active in the defense industry value chain. But it's not weapons production, it's a mix of things”, Syensqo said.

== See also ==
- Specialty chemicals
- Composite materials
