= Ernest Solvay Prize =

Award for scientific discoveries in chemistry and related fields

The Science for the Future Ernest Solvay Prize, formerly the Solvay Prize, is a scientific award for significant discoveries in chemistry and related fields awarded every two years. Managed by Syensqo via the Syensqo Fund, the prize offers a €300,000 grant to support fundamental scientific achievements made in fields such as molecular motors, metal–organic frameworks (MOFs), reticular and bioorthogonal chemistry, and advanced imaging.

== History ==
The award was established in 2013 as the Solvay Prize, Chemistry for the Future, to honor Ernest Solvay's commitment to scientific research. Its heritage is rooted in the legacy of the Solvay Conferences, a series of scientific gatherings founded by Ernest Solvay in Brussels, in 1911.

In December 2023, following the demerger of the Solvay Group, responsibility for the prize was transferred to Syensqo, a science company focused on advanced materials and specialty chemicals. Under the management of the Syensqo Fund, the award was renamed the Science for the Future Ernest Solvay Prize.

== Governance and selection ==
The prize is awarded to a single researcher in recognition of their fundamental contribution to science. Laureates are selected by an independent international jury of scientists, which has included Nobel Prize winners.
Selection of the laureate is based on scientific originality and the potential for long-term impact on global challenges, including the energy transition, climate change, and healthcare.

The award ceremony is held every two years at the Palais des Académies in Brussels, Belgium.

== Laureates ==
- 2013: Peter G. Schultz
- 2015: Ben Feringa (2016 Nobel Prize in Chemistry)
- 2017: Susumu Kitagawa (2025 Nobel Prize in Chemistry)
- 2020: Carolyn R. Bertozzi (2022 Nobel Prize in Chemistry)
- 2022: Katalin Karikó (2023 Nobel Prize in Physiology and Medicine)
- 2024: Omar Yaghi (2025 Nobel Prize in Chemistry)
- 2026: Xiaowei Zhuang
