= Ilham Kadri =

French-Moroccan business executive

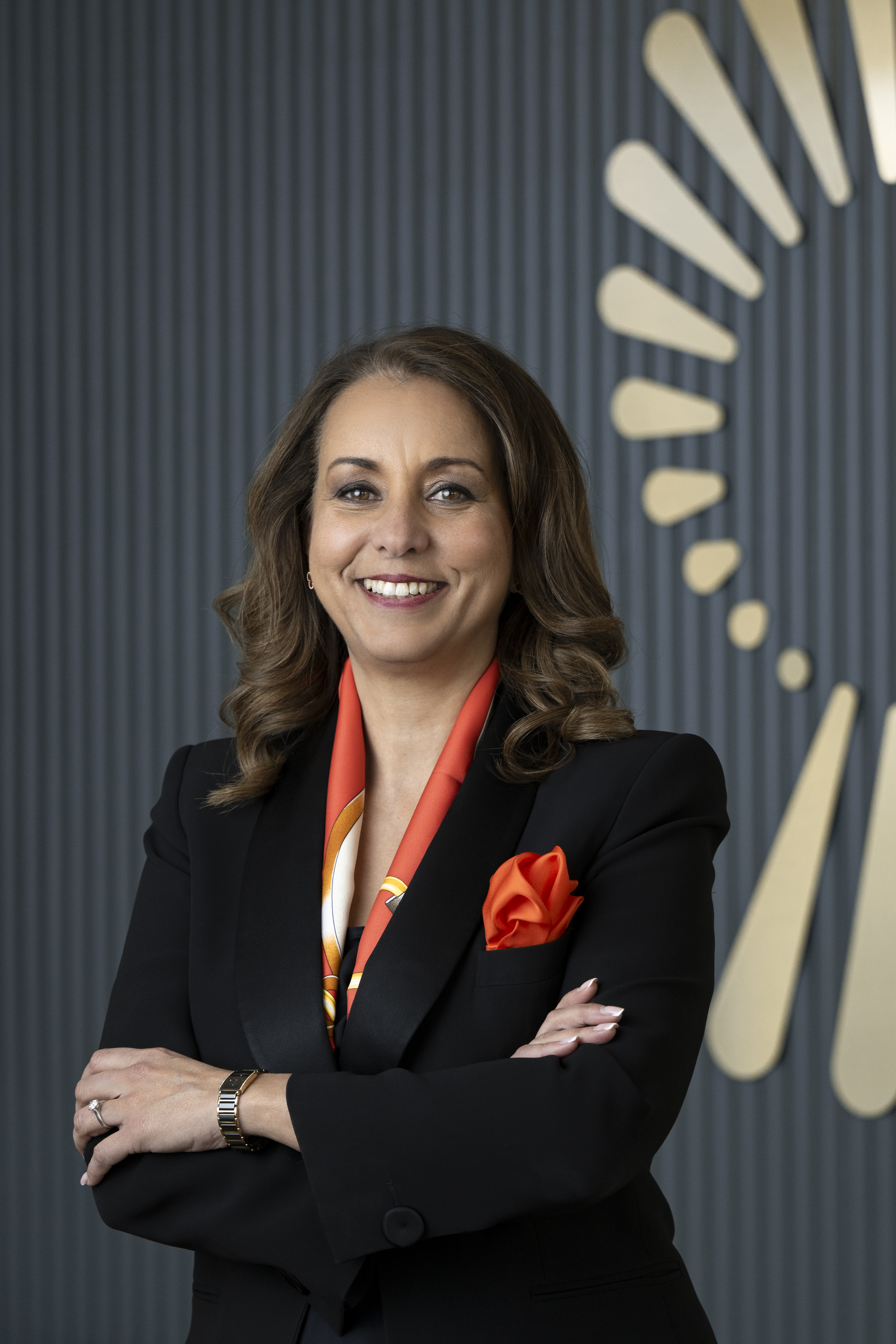
- Born: February 14, 1969 (age 57); Casablanca, Morocco
- Education: PhD in macromolecular physical chemistry; ECPM Strasbourg (ex-École des Hauts Polymères de Strasbourg)
- Occupations: Senior Advisor & Board Member
- Years active: 2026- Present

Ilham Kadri (born February 14, 1969) is a Moroccan business executive, and the former CEO of Syensqo. Between 2019 and 2023, she was the CEO of Solvay, a Belgian chemical company. After the split of the company in December 2023, she continued as CEO of Syensqo until December 2025.

== Early life and education ==
Kadri was born and grew up in Casablanca, Morocco. She studied engineering at ECPM Strasbourg (formerly École des Hauts Polymères de Strasbourg), majoring in polymer physics and chemistry. Kadri obtained her PhD in macromolecular physical chemistry in 1997.

== Career ==
=== 1997-2007 ===
Kadri started her career as a Development and Technical Service Manager at Royal Dutch Shell in Belgium, where she was part of a team that invented a synthetic bottle stopper made from a foamed thermoplastic elastomer to prevent the spread of fungi and bacteria from cork stoppers to stored liquids. She then joined LyondellBasell in France, where she worked in Sales and Global Key Account Management.

In 2002, Kadri took on a Product Management and Marketing role at UCB-Cytec in Belgium, until UCB sold its chemicals business.

In 2005, she moved to the Huntsman Corporation in Switzerland to become marketing director of the global epoxy business divested to private equity.

=== 2007-2013 ===
In 2007, Kadri joined Rohm and Haas as marketing director of its paint, coatings and construction businesses until Dow Chemical Company acquired the company in 2009.

In 2010, she became marketing director for Dow Coating Materiales. She was then appointed as General Manager Middle East and Africa (MEA) for Dow's Advanced Materials division and Commercial Director EMEA for Dow Water and Process Solutions.

While at Dow, Kadri built water purification plants in the United Arab Emirates, oversaw expansions in Kenya, Ghana and Nigeria, and developed water projects in Kuwait, Morocco, Oman, Israel, Kazakhstan and Azerbaijan. She also launched the construction of Saudi Arabia's first reverse osmosis (RO) membrane manufacturing plant.

=== 2013- January 2019 ===
From 2013, Kadri became Senior Vice President and Officer for Sealed Air Corporation, and took on the role of President of Diversey Care, the company's hygiene and cleaning business, which had suffered losses in the previous year. On arriving at Diversey Care, Kadri was tasked with the turnaround of falling sales and profits, which saw her lead reforms of the service division.

She was also a key figure in Diversey Care focusing on a strategy of technological innovation. This includes the launch of the first global range of commercial cleaning robots across the US and Europe, and a digital food safety management platform that helps organizations to achieve regulatory compliance in the food industry. Originally based in the Netherlands, Kadri relocated to Sealed Air's new corporate headquarters in Charlotte, North Carolina, when it opened in 2015.

In early 2016, Kadri became Sealed Air's Digital Leader, responsible for Internet of Things (IoT) integration across the entire company – focusing on the IS digital architecture, external ecosystems acquisitions, digital monetisation and robotics.

In 2017, following the return to profitability, Diversey Care was acquired by Bain Capital for $3.2 billion and Ilham Kadri was appointed as President & CEO of the new business, Diversey.

=== March 2019-2023 ===
In March 2019, Ilham Kadri became CEO of Solvay, where she had previously been an intern in Tavaux, France, in 1989. Her appointment was announced in October 2018.

Under her first year as CEO, Solvay launched its new strategy G.R.O.W., the Solvay One Planet sustainability plan, and its corporate purpose. In 2020, Solvay, together with the King Baudouin Foundation, created the Solvay Solidarity Fund for employees and their families impacted by the COVID-19 crisis.

Kadri was instrumental in the split of the company into the traditional Solvay and Syensqo materials unit. Syensqo was immediately after the split made part of the Bel 20 index.

=== December 2023-2025 ===
In the new Syensqo spin-off, Kadri was chief executive officer, Chair of the Executive Leadership Team, and member of the Board of Directors of Syensqo.

== Memberships ==
Kadri is an independent director at A.O. Smith Corporation and L’Oréal.

She is a steering committee member of the European Round Table for Industry (ERT), Executive Committee Chair of the World Business Council for Sustainable Development (WBCSD), permanent member of the World Economic Forum’s International Business Council (WEF), as well as member of the Leadership Council of the Industry Transition Accelerator (ITA).

She is the founder of the ISSA Hygieia Network, which she and other female cleaning industry executives founded in 2015.

Kadri is a member of The B Team, a collective of global business and civil society leaders working to catalyze better business practices for the wellbeing of people and the planet.

== Awards and recognition ==
- Kadri was ranked 21st in Fortune magazine's Most Powerful Women in Business -International list in 2019.
- In 2017, she won Golden award for Woman of the Year (Industry), and Golden award for Women Helping Women (Business) awards at the 14th annual Stevie Awards for Women in Business.
- In July 2021, she was decorated with the Légion d’honneur. She is also Doctor Honoris Causa of the University of Namur (Belgium) and EWHA University (Korea).
