= Dale Purves =

American physician

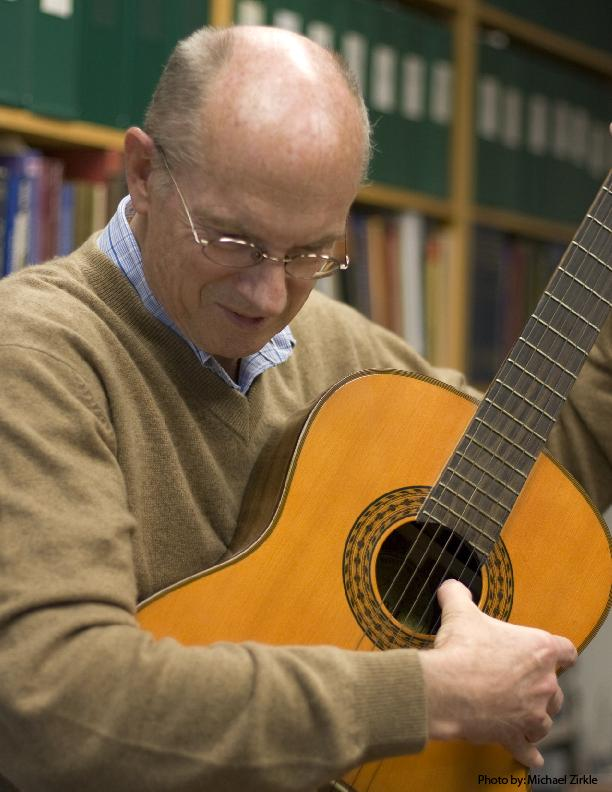
- Born: March 11, 1938
- Education: Yale University (B.A.); Harvard Medical School (M.D.)
- Scientific career
- Fields: Neuroscience
- Workplaces: Washington University in St. Louis; Duke University
- Website: www.purveslab.net

Dale Purves (born March 11, 1938) is an American neuroscientist. He is Geller Professor of Neurobiology Emeritus in the Duke Institute for Brain Sciences, where he remains research professor with additional appointments in the department of Psychology and Brain Sciences, and the department of Philosophy at Duke University.

He was appointed to the faculty at Washington University School of Medicine in 1973. He came to Duke in 1990 as the founding chair of the Department of Neurobiology at Duke Medical Center, and was subsequently Director of Duke's Center for Cognitive Neuroscience (2003-2009) and also served as the director of the Neuroscience and Behavioral Disorders Program at the Duke–NUS Medical School in Singapore (2009-2013).

== Early life and education ==
He earned a B.A. from Yale University in 1960 and an M.D. from Harvard Medical School in 1964. After further clinical training as a surgical resident at the Massachusetts General Hospital, service as a Peace Corps physician, and postdoctoral training at Harvard and University College London.

== Career ==
Purves joined the faculty of the Department of Physiology and Biophysics at the Washington University School of Medicine in 1971 and was there until 1990. During that time he studied the development of the nervous system. He was elected to the United States National Academy of Sciences in 1989.

In 1990, Purves founded the Department of Neurobiology at Duke University where he did research on the cognitive neuroscience of visual and auditory perception.

Although Purves was elected to the National Academy of Sciences in 1989 for his work on neural development and synaptic plasticity, his research during the last 15 years has sought to explain why we see and hear what we do, focusing on the visual perception of lightness, color, form, and motion, and the auditory perception of music and speech.

In addition to membership in the National Academy of Sciences, Purves is a fellow of the American Academy of Arts and Sciences and the National Academy of Medicine. His books include Principles of Neural Development (with Jeff W. Lichtman; Sinaur, 1985); Body and Brain (Harvard, 1988); Neural Activity and the Growth of the Brain (Cambridge, 1992); Why We See What We Do (with Beau Lotto; Sinauer, 2003); Perceiving Geometry (with Catherine Howe; Springer 2005); Why We See What We Do Redux (Sinauer, 2011) and Brains: How they Seem to Work (Financial Times Press, 2011). He is also lead author on the textbooks Neuroscience, (5th edition, Sinauer, 2011), Principles of Cognitive Neuroscience (2nd edition, Sinauer, 2012), and Music as Biology (Harvard University Press, 2017).

== Published works ==
=== Books ===
- Purves, D. (1985) Principles of Neural Development, Sinauer Associates, Sunderland, MA. ISBN 978-0878937448.
- Purves, D. et al. (1997) Neuroscience 1st edition. Sinauer Associates, Sunderland, MA.
- Purves, D. et al. (2001) Neuroscience 2nd edition. Sinauer Associates, Sunderland, MA.
- Purves, D. et al. (2003) Why we see what we do: An empirical theory of vision. Sinauer Associates, Sunderland, MA.
- Purves, D. et al. (2004) Neuroscience 3rd edition. Sinauer Associates, Sunderland, MA.
- Purves, D. et al. (2007) Principles of Cognitive Neuroscience Sinauer Associates, Sunderland, MA.
- Purves, D. et al. (2008) Neuroscience 4th edition. Sinauer Associates, Sunderland, MA.
- Purves, D. (2010) Brains: How they Seem to Work. Financial Times Press, NJ.
- Purves, D. et al. (2011) Neuroscience 5th edition. Sinauer Associates, Sunderland, MA.
- Purves, D. and Lotto, R. (2011) Why We See What We Do Redux: A Wholly Empirical Theory of Vision. Sinauer Associates, MA.
- Purves, D. et al. (2017) Neuroscience 6th edition. Sinauer Associates, Sunderland, MA.
- Purves, D. (2017) Music as Biology: The Tones We Like and Why. Cambridge, MA: Harvard University Press.
- Purves, D. (2019) Brains as engines of association: an operating principle for nervous systems. Oxford University Press.
- Purves, D. (2021) Why Brains Don't Compute. Springer.
