= Linda Hsieh-Wilson =

American chemist

Linda Carol Hsieh-Wilson
- Born: New York
- Education: Yale University, University of California, Berkeley (PhD 1996)
- Scientific career
- Fields: Chemical neurobiology
- Workplaces: Rockefeller University, California Institute of Technology
- Doctoral advisor: Peter G. Schultz
- Other academic advisors: Paul Greengard

Linda Carol Hsieh-Wilson is an American chemist and the Milton and Rosalind Chang Professor of Chemistry at the California Institute of Technology. She is known for her work in chemical neurobiology on understanding the structure and function of carbohydrates in the nervous system. Her studies have revealed critical roles for carbohydrates and protein glycosylation in fundamental processes ranging from cellular metabolism to memory storage. She is a member of the American Academy of Arts and Sciences and was elected to the National Academy of Sciences in 2022.

== Biography ==
Hsieh-Wilson was born in New York City, NY and received her bachelor's degree in chemistry at Yale University, where she graduated magna cum laude. She then completed her Ph.D. in 1996 at the University of California, Berkeley, where she was a National Science Foundation Fellow in the laboratory of Peter G. Schultz and studied antibody-based catalysis. She then joined the lab of Professor and Nobel Prize Laureate Paul Greengard at Rockefeller University, where she characterized the protein phosphatase and actin-binding protein spinophilin and investigated its role in dendritic spines. Hsieh-Wilson obtained an appointment in the Division of Chemistry and Chemical Engineering at the California Institute of Technology in 2000 as an assistant professor and became an investigator at the Howard Hughes Medical Institute in 2005. She was appointed to associate professor of chemistry in 2006 and full professor of chemistry at the California Institute of Technology in 2010.

== Research interests ==
=== Overview ===
Hsieh-Wilson's research is at the interface between organic chemistry and neuroscience. She investigates how the post-translational addition of glycans affect the structure and function of proteins in the nervous system. Her laboratory has developed a chemoenzymatic method to tag proteins that have been appended with a dynamic form of glycosylation called O-GlcNAc. Her work with glycosaminoglycan microarrays has significantly advanced an understanding of specific sulfated glycosaminoglycans in neuronal communication, learning, and memory as well as advanced the field of chemical biology. She has demonstrated how fucosylation can modulate neurite growth and neuronal morphology.

=== O-GlcNAc Glycosylation ===
Hsieh-Wilson and her colleagues have found that the covalent-modifications of intercellular proteins by O-linked-N-acetylglucosamine (O-GlcNAc) within the mammalian nervous system have a large role in the regulation of gene expression, neuronal signaling, and synaptic plasticity. This post-translational modification, has been analysed in the rat brain using a novel chemoenzymatic strategy wherein O-GlcNAc modified proteins are selectively labeled with fluorescent or biotin tags. This technique developed by Hsieh-Wilson and her lab has revealed over 200 O-GlcNAc modified proteins within the mammalian brain and such modifications have been shown to activate transcriptional function of proteins, regulate cancer metabolism, regulate gene expression and memory formation, and carry out many other tasks in the brain and beyond.

=== Glycosaminoglycans ===
Glycosaminoglycans are heterogeneously sulfated oligosaccharides that are very important in nervous system development, spinal cord injury, inflammation and cancer metastasis. Hsieh-Wilson's research on this subject implicates the specific sulfation sequence of glycosaminoglycans as a way to modulate biological function. Specifically, her work with chondroitin sulfate (CS) and heparan sulfate (HS), the two most common glycosaminoglycans in the nervous system, has shown that this "sulfation code" functions as a molecular recognition element for growth factors and modulates neuronal growth, indicating that these specific sulfated glycosaminoglycans play a major role in neuronal communication, learning, and memory. Additionally, Hsieh-Wilson has elucidated the role of this sulfation in glycosaminoglycan-protein interaction using a carbohydrate microarray-based approach developed in her lab.

== Awards and honors ==
- Beckman Young Investigators Award (2000)
- Research Corporation Research Innovation Award (2000)
- Alfred P. Sloan Fellowship (2003)
- Eli Lilly Award in Biological Chemistry (2006)
- Arthur C. Cope Scholar Award (2008)
- Gill Young Investigator Award in Neuroscience (2009)
