= Virginia Cornish =

Virginia W. Cornish
- Education: Columbia University (BA); University of California, Berkeley (PhD); Massachusetts Institute of Technology (post-doc)
- Known for: Chemical Biology, Genome Project-Write
- Scientific career
- Workplaces: Columbia University
- Doctoral advisor: Peter G. Schultz

Virginia Wood Cornish is the Helena Rubinstein Professor of Chemistry at Columbia University.

== Background and education ==
Cornish received her BA in chemistry in 1991, working with professor Ronald Breslow. Her PhD research, on site-specific protein labeling and mutagenesis, was carried out with Peter Schultz. Cornish was an NSF postdoctoral fellow at MIT with Robert T. Sauer. She is the first female graduate from Columbia College to be hired to a full-time faculty position since the College became coeducational in 1983.

== Research ==
Cornish and her lab group use the tools of systems biology, synthetic biology, and DNA encoding to produce desired chemical products from specific organismic hosts. In 2016, she was part of a notable group of genomic scientists calling for increased ethical study and self-regulation as the costs and effort of creating de novo genomes plummeted. As the "read" phase of the Human Genome Project was completed in 2004, this new effort was dubbed Genome Project-Write.

== Awards ==
- 2003 – Sloan Foundation Fellow
- 2009 – Pfizer Award in Enzyme Chemistry
- 2009 – Irving Sigal Young Investigator Award
