= Beau Lotto =

American scholar

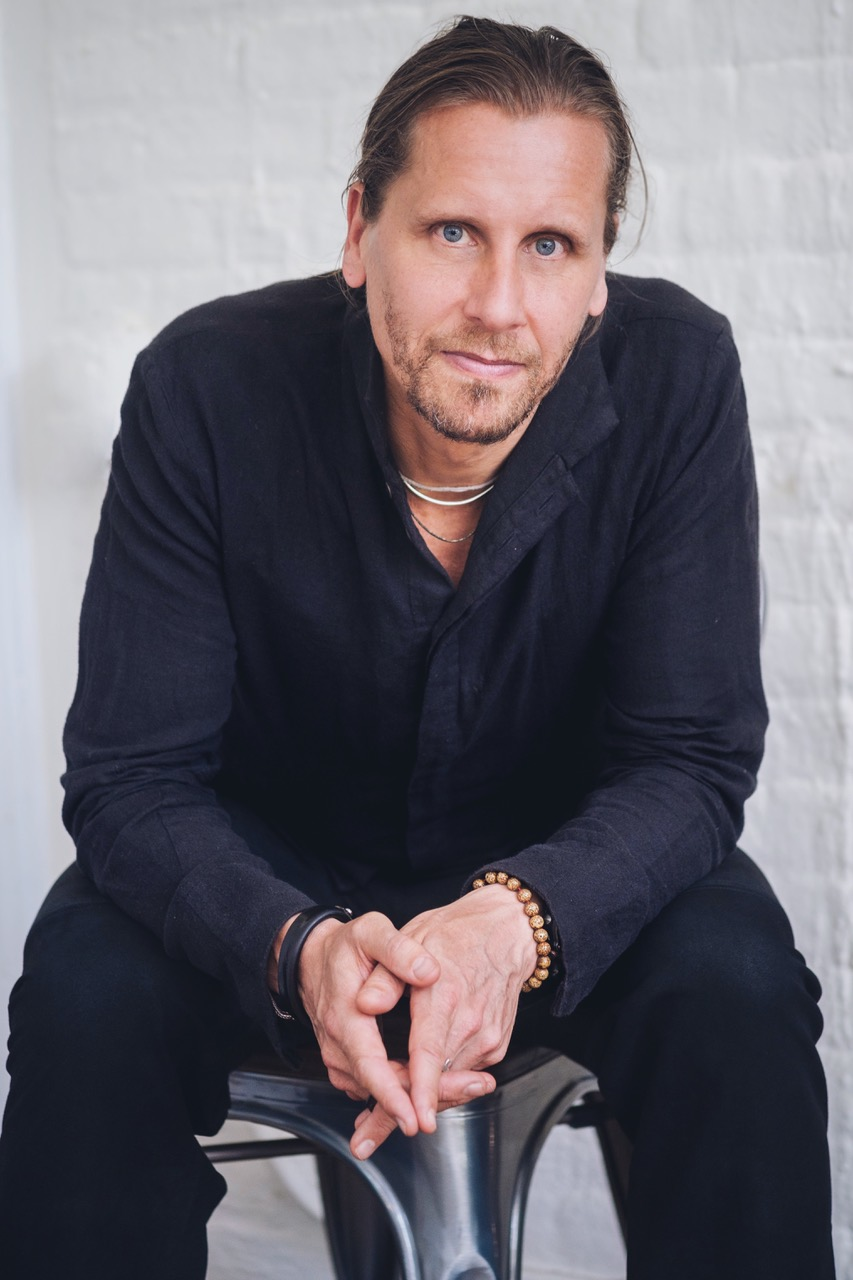

Beau Lotto is a visiting scholar at New York University. His research explores how the brain adapts to uncertainty at the cellular, computational and perceptual levels with the aim of understanding the fundamental principles of biologically-inspired innovation.

== Early life and education ==
Lotto was born in Seattle and earned his bachelor's degree in anatomy and physiology at the University of California, Berkeley in 1991. He then moved to Scotland, where he earned his PhD in Cellular and Molecular Developmental Neuroscience from University Medical School, Edinburgh in 1994. He remained in Edinburgh for his first Postdoctoral Fellowship (with Professor David Price), and then moved to Duke University for his second Fellowship, where he was mentored by Professor Dale Purves.

== Career ==
He was a Lecturer and then Reader at University College London and is now a visiting scholar at New York University. Beau and his lab have published over 70 peer reviewed articles. While at the Institute of Ophthalmology, his lab created the first app for the blind that was available on the app store. His lab has received funding from a wide range of institutions including the Wellcome Trust, the Leverhulme Trust, the BBSRC, EPSCR and MRC.

In 2001, he founded The Lab of Misfits LLC, a neuroperception creative studio. Lab of Misfits has held a two-year residency at London's Science Museum, where it became one of the UK's first ‘open labs,’ where anyone from the public could conduct real science. The Lab creates 'Experiential Experiments’ that engage the public for partnered organizations including Cirque du Soleil, L’Oreal and Asurion.

The Lab of Misfits, in collaboration with educator David Strudwick, also created the science education programme called iScientist, which uses science to teach children from ages 6 to 16 years old Compassion, Creativity, Choice, Community and Courage. The program resulted in the world's youngest peer reviewed scientist at 8 and 10-years-old, and the - then - youngest mainstage TED speaker at 12-years -old when Amy joined Beau on stage.

Lotto is also CEO and Founder of the augmented reality company Ripple Inc., which holds five patents in Augmented Reality (AR), with two further patents pending. Ripple has produced GPS-based AR apps in the industry, including Traces and Frienji.

In addition to three mainstage TED talks, Lotto has spoken at the G8, Google's Zeitgeist, Wired, Davos, Canne Lions Creativity Festival, Burning Man and the Oslo Freedom Forum. He has contributed to television, radio and podcast programs by the BBC, National Geographic*, HBO, Wharton on Business Radio,* and PBS. He is a frequent keynote speaker at major corporations including J&J, Warner Music, Universal, Viacom, Sainsburys, Microsoft, Google, Apple, where he speaks about the fundamental barriers to thriving in uncertainty and how to overcome them.

== Honors ==
He received the Josef Albers Prize for ‘Disruptive Innovation’ at the Tribeca Film Festival in New York, and was the first Creator in Residence at Viacom.

== Books ==
- Lotto, Beau. Deviate: The Science of Seeing Differently. New York: Hachette Books
- Purves, Dale and Lotto, Beau. Why We See the Way We Do: An Empirical Theory of Vision. Sunderland, MA: Sinauer Associates.

== Public art installations ==
Beau (with Mark Lythgoe and Mark Miodownick) were the first scientists to exhibit at the Hayward Gallery on the South Bank in London when they were asked to take part in the Dan Flavin Retrospective. His illusions, created with Dale Purves, have been exhibited in 30 science museums around the world, and published in multiple books on illusions. His work has been included in arts events at the Serpentine Gallery in London, the Queen Elizabeth Hall, as well as a solo show at the Wellcome Trust Collection. He currently has a live public art installation at ‘Silicon Roundabout’ on Old Street in London called Ommatidium commissioned by Transport for London.
