= Danith Ly =

Cambodian-American chemist and entrepreneur

Danith H. Ly is a Cambodian-American chemist and entrepreneur. He is a Professor of Chemistry at Carnegie Mellon University (CMU) and Founding Director of the Institute for Biomolecular Design and Discovery (IBD). His research focuses on nucleic acid chemistry, molecular recognition, and molecular engineering.

== Early life and education ==
Ly was born in Cambodia and survived the Cambodian genocide. He emigrated to the United States as a refugee in 1984.

Ly earned a bachelor's degree in chemical engineering from the Georgia Institute of Technology. He subsequently received a Ph.D. in bioorganic chemistry from the same institution. He completed postdoctoral research at the University of California, Berkeley and The Scripps Research Institute under Peter G. Schultz, where his research included studying cellular alterations related to aging.

== Career and research ==
Ly is a full professor in the Department of Chemistry at Carnegie Mellon University, where he leads a multidisciplinary research group focused on synthetic biomolecules, DNA and RNA recognition, and molecular engineering.

His laboratory has published on electron transport mechanisms in double-stranded DNA and the development of conformationally preorganized peptide nucleic acids (PNAs). This includes designing molecules capable of recognizing double-helical DNA or RNA through Watson-Crick base pairing. He also developed bifacial (Janus) nucleic acid recognition elements designed to bind to sequences of double-stranded DNA and target secondary or tertiary structures of RNA.

In the biotechnology sector, Ly has co-founded startups based on his research, including Xpeutics, Vera Therapeutics (formerly PNA Innovations), and NeuBase Therapeutics (formerly ChiraGen).

== Activism ==
Ly is active in advocacy within the Cambodian diaspora. He focuses on post-conflict recovery, civil liberties, and educational access in Southeast Asia, and participates in outreach programs linking Cambodian students with academic institutions abroad.

== Selected publications ==
- Ly, Danith; Sanii, Laurie; Schuster, Gary B. (1999). "Mechanism of Charge Transport in DNA: Internally-Linked Anthraquinone Conjugates Support Phonon-Assisted Polaron Hopping". Journal of the American Chemical Society. 121 (40): 9400–9410. Bibcode:1999JAChS.121.9400L. doi:10.1021/ja991753s.
- Ly, Danith H.; Lockhart, David J.; Lerner, Richard A.; Schultz, Peter G. (2000). "Mitotic Misregulation and Human Aging". Science. 287 (5462): 2486–2492. Bibcode:2000Sci...287.2486L. doi:10.1126/science.287.5462.2486. PMID 10741968.
- Dragulescu-Andrasi, Anca; Rapireddy, Srinivas; Frezza, Brian M.; Gayathri, Chakicherla; Gil, Roberto R.; Ly, Danith H. (2006). "A Simple γ-Backbone Modification Preorganizes Peptide Nucleic Acid into a Helical Structure". Journal of the American Chemical Society. 128 (31): 10258–10267. Bibcode:2006JAChS.12810258D. doi:10.1021/ja0625576. PMID 16881656.
- Bahal, Raman; Ali McNeer, Nicole; Quijano, Elias; Liu, Yanfeng; Sulkowski, Parker; Turchick, Audrey; Lu, Yi-Chien; Bhunia, Dinesh C.; Manna, Arunava; Greiner, Dale L.; Brehm, Michael A.; Cheng, Christopher J.; López-Giráldez, Francesc; Ricciardi, Adele; Beloor, Jagadish (2016). "In vivo correction of anaemia in β-thalassemic mice by γPNA-mediated gene editing with nanoparticle delivery". Nature Communications. 7 13304. Bibcode:2016NatCo...713304B. doi:10.1038/ncomms13304. PMC 5095181. PMID 27782131.
