= Solvac =

Solvac is a Belgian holding founded in 1983, which groups the investments of the descendants of Ernest Solvay in Solvay of which it is the largest single shareholder with 30% of its shares. Jean-Marie Solvay is President of the Board of Directors.

== Sources ==
- Trends magazine, p. 66, 27 March 2008
- Solvac (Google finance)
