= Brainbow =

Neuroimaging technique to differentiate neurons

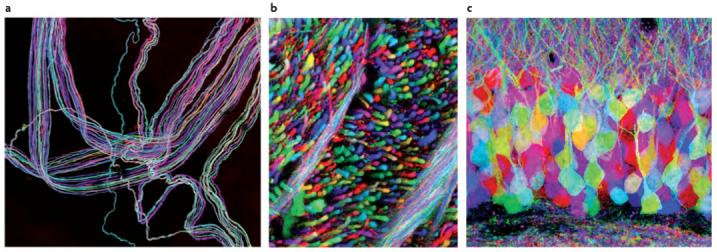
Three brainbows of mouse neurons from Lichtman and Sanes, 2008

Brainbow is a process by which individual neurons in the brain can be distinguished from neighboring neurons using fluorescent proteins. By randomly expressing different ratios of red, green, and blue derivatives of green fluorescent protein in individual neurons, it is possible to flag each neuron with a distinctive color. This process has been a major contribution to the field of neural connectomics.

The technique was originally developed in 2007 by a team led by Jeff W. Lichtman and Joshua R. Sanes, both at Harvard University. The original technique has been adapted for use with other model research organisms including the fruit fly (Drosophila melanogaster), zebrafish (Danio rerio), and Arabidopsis thaliana.

While earlier labeling techniques allowed for the mapping of only a few neurons, this new method allows more than 100 differently mapped neurons to be simultaneously and differentially illuminated. This leads to its characteristic multicolored appearance on imaging, earning its name and winning awards in science photography competitions.

== History and development ==
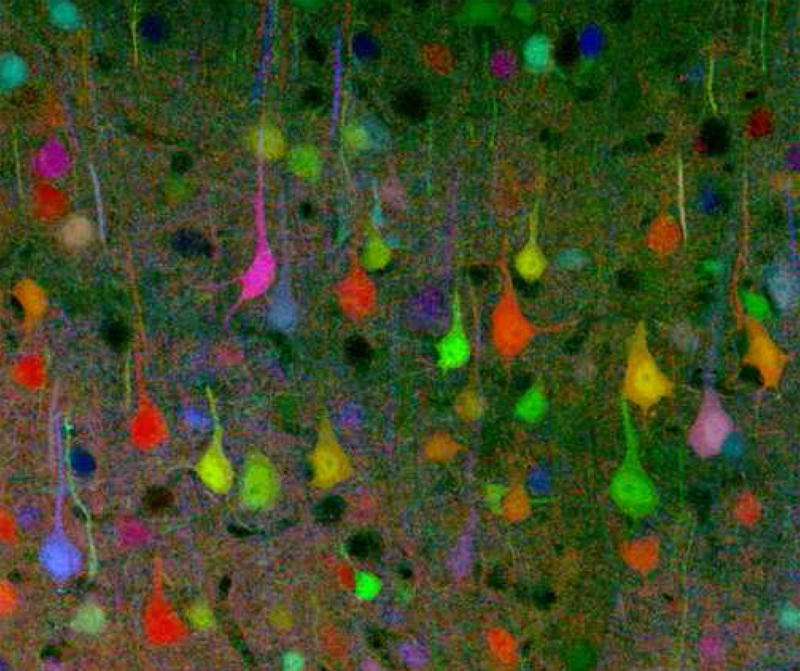
A brainbow of mouse neurons from Smith, 2007

Brainbow was initially developed by Jeff W. Lichtman and Joshua R. Sanes at Washington University in St. Louis. The team constructed Brainbow using a two-step process: first, a specific genetic construct was generated that could be recombined in multiple arrangements to produce one of either three or four colors based on the particular fluorescent proteins (XFPs) being implemented. Next, multiple copies of the same transgenic construct were inserted into the genome of the target species, resulting in the random expression of different XFP ratios and subsequently causing different cells to exhibit a variety of colorful hues.

Brainbow was originally created as an improvement over more traditional neuroimaging techniques, such as Golgi staining and dye injection, both of which presented severe limitations to researchers in their ability to visualize the intricate architecture of neural circuitry in the brain. While older techniques were only able to stain cells with a constricted range of colors, often utilizing bi- and tri-color transgenic mice to unveil limited information in regards to neuronal structures, Brainbow is much more flexible in that it has the capacity to fluorescently label individual neurons with up to approximately 100 different hues so that scientists can identify and even differentiate between dendritic and axonal processes. By revealing such detailed information about neuronal connectivity and patterns, sometimes even in vivo, scientists are often able to infer information regarding neuronal interactions and their subsequent impact upon behavior and function. Thus, Brainbow filled the void left by previous neuroimaging methods.

With the recent advent of Brainbow in neuroscience, researchers are able to construct specific maps of neural circuits and better investigate how these relate to mental activities and their connected behaviors (i.e. Brainbow reveals information about the interconnections between neurons and their subsequent interactions that affect overall brain functionality). Brainbow can therefore also be used to study both neurological and psychological disorders by analyzing differences in neural maps.

== Methods ==
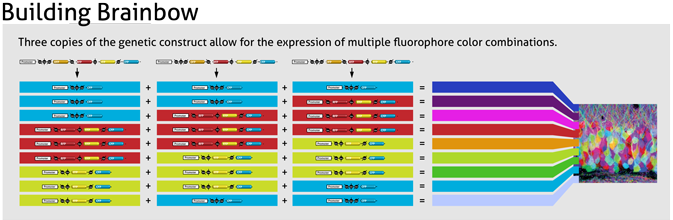
Three copies of the genetic construct allow for the expression of multiple fluorophore color combinations. Lawson Kurtz et al. / Duke University

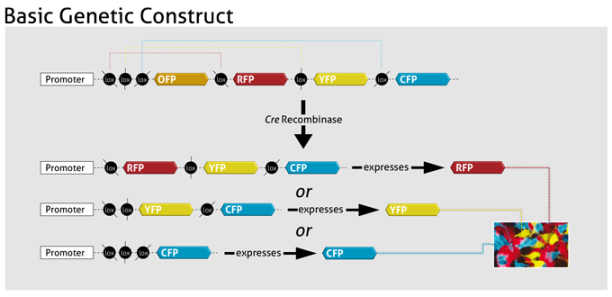
The basic Brainbow1 genetic construct. Lawson Kurtz et al. / Duke University

Brainbow techniques rely on the Cre-Lox recombination, in which the protein Cre recombinase drives inversion or excision of DNA between loxP sites. The original Brainbow method includes both Brainbow-1 and Brainbow-2, which utilize different forms of cre/lox recombination. Brainbow-3, a modified version of Brainbow-1, was developed in 2013. For all Brainbow subtypes, the expression of a given XFP is a stochastic, or random, event.

Brainbow-1 uses DNA constructs with different fluorescent protein genes (XFPs) separated by mutant and canonical forms of loxP. This creates a set of mutually exclusive excision possibilities, since cre-mediated recombination occurs only between identical loxP sites. After recombination occurs, the fluorescent protein that is left directly after the promoter is uniquely expressed. Thus, a construct with four XFPs separated by three different loxP sites, three excision events, and the original construct can produce four different fluorescent proteins.

Brainbow-2 uses Cre excision and inversion to allow multiple expression possibilities in a given construct. In one DNA segment with two oppositely oriented XFPs, Cre will induce a random inversion event that leaves one fluorescent protein in the proper orientation for expression. If two of these invertible sequences are aligned, three different inversion events are possible. When excision events are also considered, one of four fluorescent proteins will be expressed for a given combination of Cre excisions and inversions.

Brainbow-3 retains the Brainbow-1 loxP format, but replaces the RFP, YFP, and CFP genes with mOrange2, EGFP, and mKate2. mO2, EGFP, and mK2 were chosen both because their fluorescent excitation and emission spectra overlap minimally, and because they share minimal sequence homology, allowing for the design of selective antibodies that can be used to detect them in immunohistochemical protocols. Brainbow-3 also addresses the issue of uneven filling of neurons with XFPs by using farnesylated derivatives of the XFPs, which are more evenly trafficked to neuronal membranes.

Brainbow is implemented in vivo by crossing two transgenic organism strains: one that expresses the Cre protein and another that has been transfected with several versions of a loxP/XFP construct. Using multiple copies of the transgene allows the XFPs to combine in a way that can give one of approximately 100 different colors. Thus, each neuron is labeled with a different hue based on its given combinatorial and stochastic expression of fluorescent proteins.

In order to elucidate differential XFP expression patterns into a visible form, brain slices are imaged with confocal microscopy. When exposed to a photon with its particular excitation wavelength, each fluorophore emits a signal that is collected into a red, green, or blue channel, and the resultant light combination is analyzed with data analysis software. Superimposition of differentially colored neurons allows visual disentanglement of complicated neural circuits.

Brainbow has predominantly been tested in mice to date; however, the basic technique described above has also been modified for use in more recent studies since the advent of the original method introduced in 2007.

=== Mice ===
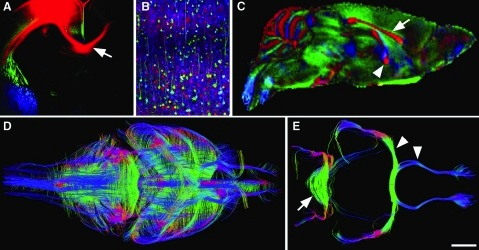
A brainbow of neurons in a mouse embryo (b), as well as some tractographical images of similar neurons (Chédotal and Richards, 2010)

The mouse brain has 75,000,000 neurons and is more similar to a human brain than drosophila and other commonly used organisms to model this technique, such as C. elegans. Mice were the first organisms in which the Brainbow method of neuroimaging was successfully employed. Livet et al. (2007) developed two versions of Brainbow mice using Brainbow-1 and Brainbow-2, which are described above. In using these methods to create a complete map and track the axons of a mouse muscle, it is necessary to collect tens of thousands of images and compile them into stacks to create a complete schematic. It is then possible to trace each motor axon and its synaptic contacts to construct a complete connectome of the muscle.

More examples of neurons examined using the Brainbow technique in transgenic mice are located in the motor nerve innervating ear muscles, axon tracts in the brainstem, and the hippocampal dentate gyrus.

=== Drosophila ===
The complexity of the Drosophila brain, consisting of about 100,000 neurons, makes it an excellent candidate for implementing neurophysiology and neuroscience techniques like Brainbow. In fact, Stefanie Hampel et al. (2011) combined Brainbow in conjunction with genetic targeting tools to identify individual neurons within the Drosophila brain and various neuronal lineages. One of the genetic targeting tools was a GAL4/UAS binary expression system that controls the expression of UAS-Brainbow and targets the expression to small groups of neurons. Utilizing 'Flip Out' methods increased the cellular resolution of the reporter construct. The expression of fluorescent proteins, as with the original Brainbow, depended on Cre recombination corresponding with matched lox sites. Hampel et al. (2011) also developed their own variation of Brainbow (dBrainbow), based on antibody labeling of epitopes rather than endogenous fluorescence. Two copies of their construct yield six bright, separable colors. This, along with simplifications in color assignment, enabled them to observe the trajectories of each neuron over long distances. Specifically, they traced motor neurons from the antennal lobe to neuromuscular junctions, allowing them to identify the specific muscle targets of individual neurons.

Ultimately, this technique provides the ability to efficaciously map the neuronal circuitry in Drosophila so that researchers are able to uncover more information about the brain structure of this invertebrate and how it relates to its ensuing behavior.

=== Zebrafish ===
Zebrafish (Danio rerio) is a vertebrate model in which neurodevelopment can be easily studied because the embryos are transparent and develop externally. Zebrabow was based on the original Brainbow to study the nervous system and has been modified to study other tissues in zebrafish as well.

== Limitations ==
As with any neuroimaging technique, Brainbow has a number of limitations that stem from the methods required to perform it. For example, the process of breeding at least two strains of transgenic animals from embryonic stem cells is both time-consuming and complex. Even if two transgenic species are successfully created, not all of their offspring will show the recombination. Thus, this requires extensive planning prior to performing an experiment.

In addition, due to the random nature in the expression of the fluorescent proteins, scientists are unable to precisely control the labeling of neural circuitry, which may result in the poor identification of specific neurons.

The use of brainbow in mammalian populations is also hampered by the incredible diversity of neurons of the central nervous system. The sheer density of neurons coupled with the presence of long tracts of axons make viewing larger regions of the CNS with high resolution difficult. Brainbow is most useful when examining single cell resolution against the background of a complex multicellular environment. However, due to the resolution limits of optical microscopy, conclusive identification of synaptic connections between neurons is not easily accomplished. This issue is somewhat avoided by the use of synaptic markers to supplement the use of optical microscopy in viewing synaptic connections.

== See also ==
- GFP
- Fluorescence
- Cre-Lox recombination
