= Young-Tae Chang =

South Korean academic (born 1968)

- 장영태
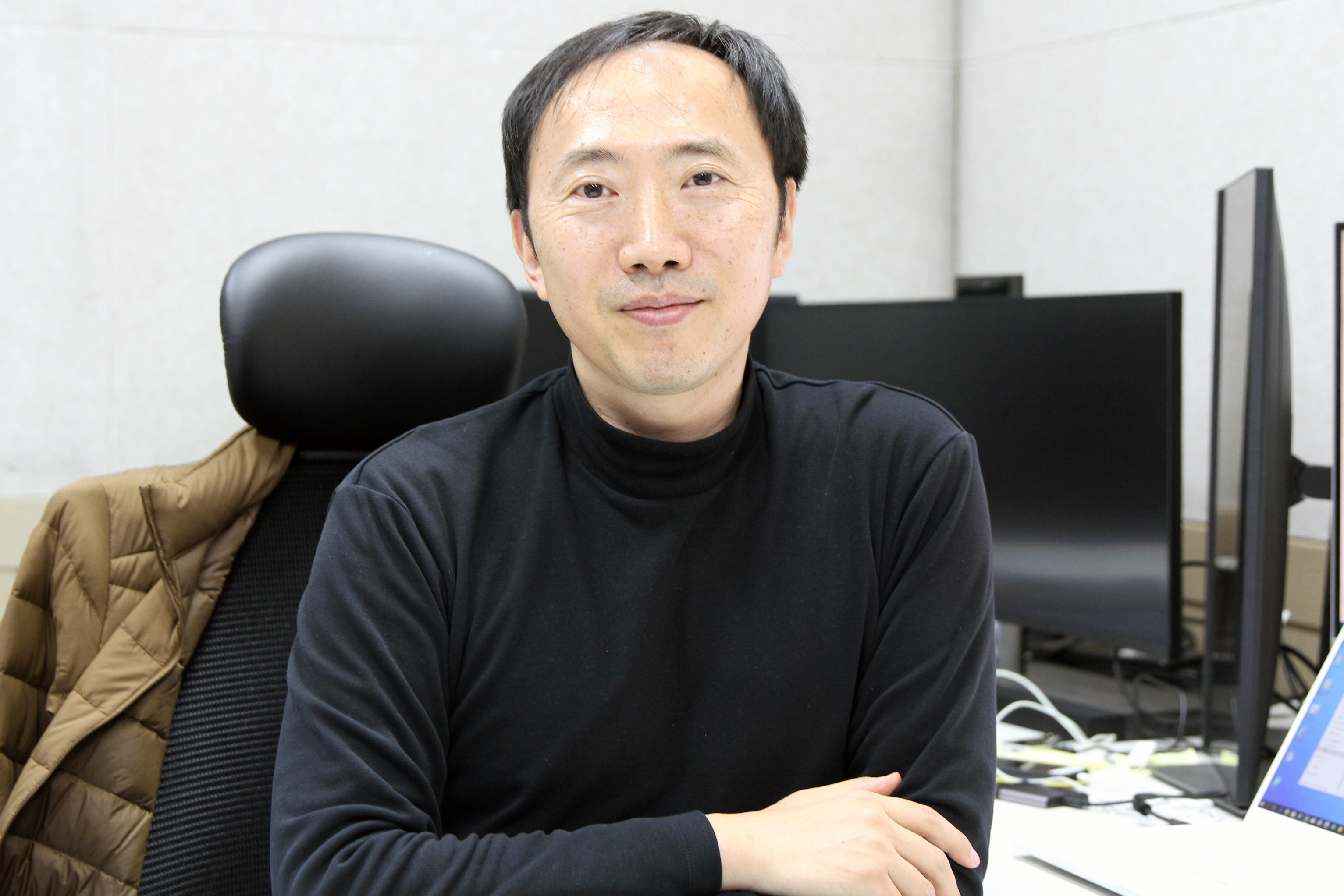
- Chang in 2019
- Born: 1968 (age 57–58); Busan, South Korea
- Education: Pohang University of Science and Technology (PhD)
- Scientific career
- Fields: Chemistry; bioimaging; fluorescent chemical probes
- Workplaces: New York University; National University of Singapore; Singapore Bioimaging Consortium; POSTECH; Institute for Basic Science (Center for Self-assembly and Complexity)
- Doctoral advisor: Sung-Kee Chung
- Other academic advisors: Peter G. Schultz

Korean name
- Hangul: 장영태
- RR: Jang Yeongtae
- MR: Chang Yŏngt'ae
- Website: http://ytchang.postech.ac.kr

Young-Tae Chang (Korean: 장영태; born 1968) is a South Korean chemist. He is a professor of chemistry at Pohang University of Science and Technology (POSTECH).

Young-Tae Chang was born in Busan, South Korea in 1968. He obtained the Ph.D. degree in chemistry from POSTECH, working on the divergent synthesis of all regioisomers of myo-inositol phosphates, under guide of Prof. Sung-Kee Chung. Doctoral requirements at POSTECH require a student study at least three years, but Young-Tae finished in two, requiring his advisor to appeal for a revision of the rules which allowed him to receive his doctorate in February 1997. He then engaged in postdoctoral research in the laboratory of Prof. Peter G. Schultz at University of California, Berkeley and Scripps Research in 2000.

He was appointed assistant professor at New York University (NYU) in 2000 and promoted to associate professor with tenure in 2005. In September 2007, he moved to the National University of Singapore and the Singapore Bioimaging Consortium as a lab head at Biopolis. From 2017, he is a Full Professor in the Department of Chemistry, POSTECH and the Associate Director under Kim Kimoon at the Center for Self-assembly and Complexity at the Institute for Basic Science located on the POSTECH campus. He pioneered diversity-oriented fluorescence library approach (DOFLA), and developed embryonic stem cell probe CDy1, neuronal stem cell probe CDr3, and neron specific probe, NeuO. He also developed a method for background-free live cell imaging with tamed fluorescent probe. He also co-developed a super-photostable small-molecule fluorophore, Phoenix Fluor 555 (PF555), which enables long-term live-cell single-protein imaging. These days, he is focusing on developing fluorescent probes for the selective detection of senescent cells.

He is an editorial board member of MedChemComm and RSC Advances, Royal Society of Chemistry, Angewandte Chemie and American Journal of Nuclear Medicine and Molecular Imaging. He has published more than 400 scientific papers and 3 books resulting in more than 31,000 citations. Additionally, he has filed more than 60 patents.

== Honors and awards ==
- 2023: Yoshida Prize, International Organic Chemistry Foundation
- 2022: Sang-Chul Shim Academic Award, Korean Chemical Society
- 2007: NUS Young Investigator Award
- 2005: Career Award, National Science Foundation

== Press coverage ==
1. 포스텍-한국뇌연구원, 뇌 신경세포 선택적 염색 메커니즘 규명. news1 (in Korean). Retrieved 26 August 2025.
2. 포스텍, 색으로 간암 경계를 정확히 구분하는 기술 개발. etnews (in Korean). Retrieved 17 April 2025.
3. POSTECH 연구팀, 세포 내 단백질의 비밀 밝히는 초광안정적인 유기형광분자 개발. 중앙이코노미뉴스 (in Korean). Retrieved 25 February 2025.
4. 한국도레이과학진흥재단 과학기술상에 장영태∙문주호 교수. Fashion post (in Korean). Retrieved 5 September 2023.
5. 특정 타깃을 구별해주는 형광물질 활용해 ‘암’을 넘어 ‘노화’의 원인과 조절인자 발굴에 도전한다. 월간인물 (in Korean). Retrieved 19 April 2023.
6. 암 치료 진단·치료 동시에 가능…포스텍 연구팀 실험으로 입증. News1 (in Korean). Retrieved 27 March 2023.
7. 포스텍 장영태 교수팀, 암 진행 돕는 대식세포만 선택 염색하는 형광 프로브 개발. 미디어 경북 (in Korean). Retrieved 20 March 2023.
8. 포항공대 장영태 교수, 국제유기화학재단 요시다상 받아. 연합뉴스 (in Korean). Retrieved 8 February 2023.
9. 세포 소기관별 온도를 영상으로 볼수 있는 형광 온도계 개발. etnews (in Korean). Retrieved 1 September 2022.
10. 포스텍 장영태 교수, ‘심상철 학술상’ 수상. 경북매일 (in Korean). Retrieved 22 April 2022.
11. POSTECH 장영태 교수, 대한화학회 학술상 수상. The Financial News (in Korean). Retrieved 22 April 2022.
12. POSTECH, 세포 '형광펜 긋듯' 식별···정확도 높여. helloDD (in Korean). Retrieved 8 March 2022.
13. 암세포에 색깔 입히는 형광물질 연구자 장영태 포항공대 교수. 주간조선 (in Korean). Retrieved 24 July 2020.
