= Richard Robson (chemist) =

British and Australian chemist (born 1937)

Richard Robson FAA FRS
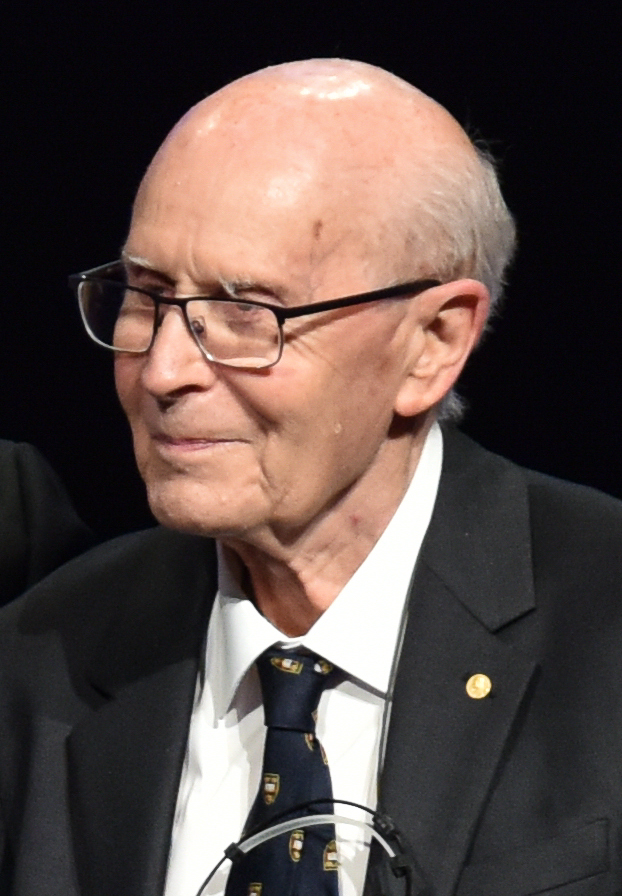
- Robson in 2025
- Born: 4 June 1937 (age 89); Glusburn, England, UK
- Education: Brasenose College, Oxford (BA, DPhil)
- Known for: Coordination polymers Metal-organic frameworks
- Awards: Nobel Prize in Chemistry (2025)
- Scientific career
- Fields: Inorganic chemistry
- Workplaces: University of Melbourne
- Thesis: Some Studies on the Ultraviolet Irradiation of Charge-Transfer Complexes and Related Systems (1962)
- Doctoral advisor: John A. Barltrop
- Other academic advisors: Henry Taube
- Website: findanexpert.unimelb.edu.au/profile/15996-richard-robson

Richard Robson FAA FRS (born 4 June 1937) is an English and Australian chemist and Professor of Chemistry at the University of Melbourne. Robson specialises in coordination polymers, particularly metal-organic frameworks. He has been described as "a pioneer in crystal engineering involving transition metals". In 2025, he was awarded the Nobel Prize in Chemistry jointly with Susumu Kitagawa and Omar M. Yaghi for the development of metal-organic frameworks.

== Early life and education ==
Robson was born in Glusburn, West Yorkshire (now North Yorkshire), England, on 4 June 1937. He read chemistry at Brasenose College, Oxford, earning a BA in 1959 and a DPhil in 1962. His doctoral research, supervised by John A. Barltrop at the Dyson Perrins Laboratory, focused on the photochemistry of organic molecules.

Robson conducted postdoctoral research at the California Institute of Technology (1962–64) and Stanford University (1964–65) under Henry Taube before accepting a lectureship in chemistry at the University of Melbourne in 1966, where he remained for the rest of his career.

== Research ==
Richard Robson's groundbreaking research established foundational principles in the field of coordination polymers, particularly for infinite polymeric frameworks—later termed metal–organic frameworks (MOFs). His interest in the field was sparked in 1974 while constructing large wooden models of crystalline structures for first-year chemistry lectures.

In the 1990s, Robson created a new class of coordination polymers that underpinned an entire modern field of chemistry. His innovative approach used copper(I), which favours a tetrahedral geometry, in combination with a custom-designed tetranitrile organic linker. This method produced crystalline scaffolds with a diamond-like structure but with significant, engineered void space within the framework.

== Honors and awards ==
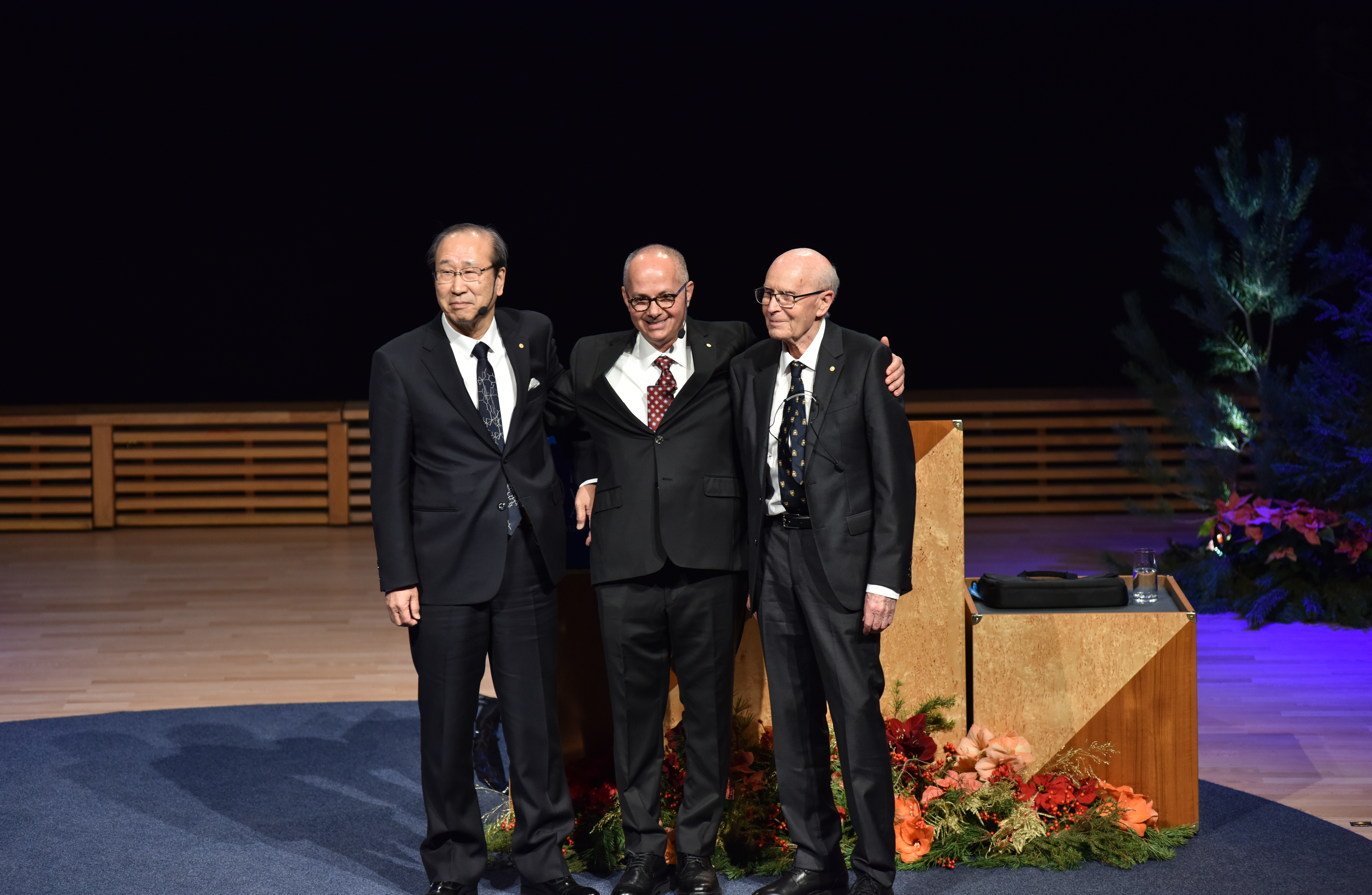
Robson with Susumu Kitagawa and Omar Yaghi

Robson received the Burrows Award from the Inorganic Division of The Royal Australian Chemical Institute in 1998 and was elected a Fellow of the Australian Academy of Science in 2000. He was elected a Fellow of the Royal Society in 2022.

Robson shared the 2025 Nobel Prize in Chemistry for his early contribution to the field of metal–organic frameworks (MOFs).

== Personal life ==
His daughter is former TV presenter Naomi Robson.

== Selected publications ==
- Hoskins, Bernard F.; Robson, Richard (1989). "Infinite polymeric frameworks consisting of three dimensionally linked rod-like segments". Journal of the American Chemical Society. 111 (15): 5962–5964. Bibcode:1989JAChS.111.5962H. doi:10.1021/ja00197a079. ISSN 0002-7863.
- Hoskins, B. F.; Robson, Richard (1990). "Design and construction of a new class of scaffolding-like materials comprising infinite polymeric frameworks of 3D-linked molecular rods. A reappraisal of the zinc cyanide and cadmium cyanide structures and the synthesis and structure of the diamond-related frameworks [N(CH3)4][CuIZnII(CN)4] and CuI[4,4',4,4'-tetracyanotetraphenylmethane]BF4.xC6H5NO2". Journal of the American Chemical Society. 112 (4): 1546–1554. Bibcode:1990JAChS.112.1546H. doi:10.1021/ja00160a038. ISSN 0002-7863.
- Batten, Stuart R.; Robson, Richard (19 June 1998). "Interpenetrating Nets: Ordered, Periodic Entanglement". Angewandte Chemie International Edition. 37 (11): 1460–1494. doi:10.1002/(SICI)1521-3773(19980619)37:11<1460::AID-ANIE1460>3.0.CO;2-Z.
