= Jeff W. Lichtman =

American neuroscientist

- Born: 1951 (age 74–75); Salt Lake City, Utah
- Education: Bowdoin College; Washington University in St. Louis
- Known for: Brainbow
- Awards: Member, National Academy of Sciences (2014)
- Scientific career
- Fields: Molecular & cellular neuroscience
- Workplaces: Washington University in St. Louis; Harvard University
- Doctoral advisor: Dale Purves
- Website: https://lichtmanlab.fas.harvard.edu/

Jeff William Lichtman (born 1951) is an American neuroscientist. He is the Jeremy R. Knowles Professor of Molecular and Cellular Biology and Santiago Ramón y Cajal Professor of Arts and Sciences at Harvard University. He is best known for his pioneering work developing the neuroimaging connectomic technique known as Brainbow.

== Education and career ==
Lichtman was born in Salt Lake City, Utah in 1951. He grew up in the Northeastern United States. Lichtman received a BA from Bowdoin College in 1973. In 1980, he received both MD and PhD from Washington University in St. Louis, where he was advised by Dale Purves. After completing postdoctoral work at Harvard Medical School, he established his lab at Washington University School of Medicine and conducted research there for 30 years.

In 2004, he was appointed Jeremy R. Knowles Professor of Molecular and Cellular Biology at Harvard University. In 2013, he was named the inaugural Santiago Ramón y Cajal Professor, a five-year appointment intended to recognize outstanding research and teaching. Lichtman is a faculty member within the Harvard Center for Brain Science and the Conte Center at Harvard University. From 2013 to 2016, he was a Grass Foundation Trustee.

== Research ==
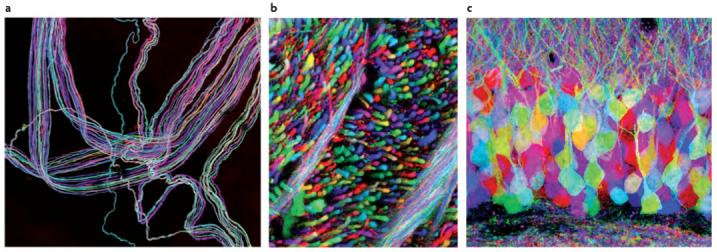
Up to ~160 colours were observed in the first Brainbow mice. (a) A motor nerve innervating ear muscle. (b) An axon tract in the brainstem. c) The dentate gyrus. From Lichtman and Sanes, 2008.

The Lichtman lab studies activity-dependent plasticity in motor and autonomic circuits of living animals. Lichtman hypothesizes that axons undergo synaptic pruning and strengthening in response to experiences, and these experiences cause neurons which co-innervate the same cell to compete for dominance, thereby driving synaptic plasticity. The lab uses genetically modified mice and automated imaging tools to identify neural circuit motifs throughout the nervous system.

In 2007, Lichtman and Joshua R. Sanes first published the Brainbow mouse method, in which different fluorescent proteins are expressed stochastically in neighboring neurons within a mouse's nervous system, thereby allowing neighboring neuronal processes to be distinguishable by fluorescence microscopy. Subsequently, this technique has been adapted and used to map neural circuits in mice, Caenorhabditis elegans, and Drosophila melanogaster.

Additionally, the Lichtman lab developed a device called the Automatic Tape-Collecting Lathe Ultramicrotome (ATLUM), which can be used for automated electron microscopy in neural circuit reconstruction. Data from the Lichtman lab has been used in the citizen science game EyeWire, developed in collaboration with Sebastian Seung and Winfried Denk, to construct a full connectome of the mouse retina.

The lab is also interested in inhibitory interneurons in the prefrontal cortex, which are thought to be selectively vulnerable in mental disorders such as autism or schizophrenia.

== Awards and honors ==
- Member, National Academy of Sciences (2014)
- Transformative Research R01 Award, National Institutes of Health (2011)

== Selected publications ==
- Sanes, Joshua R.; Lichtman, Jeff W. (March 1999). "Development of the vertebrate neuromuscular junction". Annual Review of Neuroscience. 22 (1): 389–442. doi:10.1146/annurev.neuro.22.1.389. ISSN 0147-006X. PMID 10202544.
- Feng, Guoping; Mellor, Rebecca H.; Bernstein, Michael; Keller-Peck, Cynthia; Nguyen, Quyen T.; Wallace, Mia; Nerbonne, Jeanne M.; Lichtman, Jeff W.; Sanes, Joshua R. (October 2000). "Imaging Neuronal Subsets in Transgenic Mice Expressing Multiple Spectral Variants of GFP". Neuron. 28 (1): 41–51. doi:10.1016/s0896-6273(00)00084-2. ISSN 0896-6273. PMID 11086982.
- Sanes, Joshua R.; Lichtman, Jeff W. (November 2001). "Induction, assembly, maturation and maintenance of a postsynaptic apparatus". Nature Reviews Neuroscience. 2 (11): 791–805. doi:10.1038/35097557. ISSN 1471-0048. PMID 11715056.
- Lichtman, Jeff W.; Conchello, José-Angel (December 2005). "Fluorescence microscopy". Nature Methods. 2 (12): 910–919. doi:10.1038/nmeth817. ISSN 1548-7105. PMID 16299476.
- Livet, Jean; Weissman, Tamily A.; Kang, Hyuno; Draft, Ryan W.; Lu, Ju; Bennis, Robyn A.; Sanes, Joshua R.; Lichtman, Jeff W. (November 2007). "Transgenic strategies for combinatorial expression of fluorescent proteins in the nervous system". Nature. 450 (7166): 56–62. Bibcode:2007Natur.450...56L. doi:10.1038/nature06293. ISSN 1476-4687. PMID 17972876.
- Witvliet, Daniel; Mulcahy, Ben; Mitchell, James K.; Meirovitch, Yaron; Berger, Daniel R.; Wu, Yuelong; Liu, Yufang; Koh, Wan Xian; Parvathala, Rajeev; Holmyard, Douglas; Schalek, Richard L.; Shavit, Nir; Chisholm, Andrew D.; Lichtman, Jeff W.; Samuel, Aravinthan D. T.; Zhen, Mei (August 2021). "Connectomes across development reveal principles of brain maturation". Nature. 596 (7871): 257–261. Bibcode:2021Natur.596..257W. doi:10.1038/s41586-021-03778-8. ISSN 1476-4687. PMC 8756380. PMID 34349261.
