= Xiaowei Zhuang =

Chinese-American biophysicist (born 1972)

- 庄小威
- Born: January 21, 1972 (age 54); Rugao, Jiangsu, China
- Education: University of Science and Technology of China (BS); University of California, Berkeley (PhD)
- Known for: Stochastic Optical Reconstruction Microscopy (STORM)
- Awards: MacArthur Fellows Program (2003); ACS Award in Pure Chemistry (2007); Max Delbruck Prize (2010); Sackler Prize (2011); NAS Award in Molecular Biology (2015); Breakthrough Prize in Life Sciences (2019); Vilcek Prize in Biomedical Science (2020); Heinrich Wieland Prize (2022)
- Scientific career
- Fields: Biophysics
- Workplaces: Harvard University; Howard Hughes Medical Institute
- Doctoral students: Melike Lakadamyali

Xiaowei Zhuang (simplified Chinese: 庄小威; traditional Chinese: 莊小威; pinyin: Zhuāng Xiǎowēi; born 21 January 1972) is a Chinese-American biophysicist who is the David B. Arnold Jr. Professor of Science, Professor of Chemistry and Chemical Biology, and Professor of Physics at Harvard University, and an Investigator at the Howard Hughes Medical Institute. She is best known for her work in the development of Stochastic Optical Reconstruction Microscopy (STORM), a super-resolution fluorescence microscopy method, and the discoveries of novel cellular structures using STORM. She received a 2019 Breakthrough Prize in Life Sciences for developing super-resolution imaging techniques that get past the diffraction limits of traditional light microscopes, allowing scientists to visualize small structures within living cells. She was elected a Member of the American Philosophical Society in 2019 and was awarded a Vilcek Foundation Prize in Biomedical Science in 2020.

== Early life and education ==
Zhuang's father Zhuang Lixian (庄礼贤) and mother Zhu Renzhi (朱仁芝) are both professors at the University of Science and Technology of China (USTC).

Zhuang graduated from the USTC with a BS in physics in 1991. She obtained her PhD in physics from the University of California, Berkeley in 1996 and conducted her thesis research under the supervision of Dr. Yuen-Ron Shen. In 1997–2001, she was a Chodorow Postdoctoral Fellow in the laboratory of Dr. Steven Chu at Stanford University. She started her faculty position in the Department of Chemistry and Chemical Biology and the Department of Physics at Harvard University in 2001 and was promoted to full professor in 2006.

She was named a Howard Hughes Medical Investigator in 2005.

== Research ==
Zhuang's laboratory invented Stochastic Optical Reconstruction Microscopy (STORM), a single-molecule-based super-resolution fluorescence microscopy method. The Zhuang laboratory demonstrated three-dimensional super-resolution imaging with STORM. The Zhuang laboratory also discovered several photoswitchable dye molecules that enabled STORM imaging and demonstrated live-cell STORM imaging.

Using STORM, Zhuang and colleagues have studied a variety of biological systems, ranging from single-cell organisms to complex brain tissues. These studies led to the discovery of novel cellular structures, such as the periodic membrane skeletons in the axons of neurons and provided insights into many other cellular structures.

The Zhuang laboratory invented a single-cell transcriptome imaging method, MERFISH (multiplexed error-robust fluorescence in situ hybridization), which allows numerous RNA species to be imaged and quantified in single cells in their native context. Zhuang and colleagues used single-molecule FRET to study biomolecules and molecular complexes and developed single-virus tracking methods to study virus-cell interactions.

== Honors and awards ==
- 2026: Dickson Prize in Medicine
- 2026: Ernest Solvay Prize by Syensqo
- 2024: National Inventors Hall of Fame
- 2023: Dreyfus Prize in the Chemical Sciences
- 2022: J. Allyn Taylor International Prize in Medicine
- 2022: Honorary doctorate, Icahn School of Medicine at Mount Sinai
- 2022: Heinrich Wieland Prize
- 2021: Great Immigrants Award honored by the Carnegie Corporation of New York
- 2021: Lurie Prize in Biomedical Sciences
- 2020: Vilcek Foundation Prize in Biomedical Science
- 2019: Pearl Meister Greengard Prize
- 2019: NAS Award for Scientific Discovery
- 2019: Member American Philosophical Society
- 2019: Breakthrough Prize in Life Sciences
- 2018: Dr. H.P. Heineken Prize for Biochemistry and Biophysics, Royal Netherlands Academy of Arts and Sciences
- 2018: Pittsburgh Analytical Chemistry Award
- 2017: Honorary doctorate, Delft University of Technology
- 2017: Lennart Nilsson Award, Karolinska Institute, Sweden
- 2016: Doctor of Philosophy Honoris Causa, Stockholm University
- 2016: Vallee Visiting Professorship
- 2015: Foreign academician of the Chinese Academy of Sciences
- 2015: NAS Award in Molecular Biology
- 2015: Pearse Prize, Royal Microscopical Society
- 2013: Member American Academy of Arts and Sciences
- 2012: Member National Academy of Sciences
- 2012: Fellow American Physical Society
- 2012: Fellow American Association for the Advancement of Science
- 2011: Sackler Prize
- 2010: Max Delbruck Prize
- 2008: Coblentz Award
- 2007: ACS Award in Pure Chemistry
- 2004: Sloan Fellowship
- 2003: Packard Fellowship
- 2003: MacArthur Fellows Program
- 2003: Beckman Young Investigators Award
