= Peter G. Schultz =

American biosynthetic chemist

- Born: June 23, 1956 (age 70); Cincinnati, Ohio, U.S.
- Education: California Institute of Technology (BS, PhD)
- Awards: ACS Award in Pure Chemistry (1990); Wolf Prize (1994)
- Scientific career
- Fields: Chemical biology
- Workplaces: The Scripps Research Institute,
- Doctoral advisor: Peter Dervan
- Other academic advisors: Christopher Walsh
- Notable students: David Liu; Sara Cherry; Nathanael Gray; Kevan M. Shokat; Lei Wang; Virginia Cornish; Alice Y. Ting; Young-Tae Chang; Linda Hsieh-Wilson; Danith Ly

Peter G. Schultz (born June 23, 1956) is an American chemist, entrepreneur, and nonprofit leader. He is the CEO and president and Professor of Chemistry at Scripps Research, the founder and former director of GNF, and the founding director of the California-Skaggs Institute for Innovative Medicines, established in 2012.

== Academic career ==
Schultz completed his undergraduate degree at Caltech in 1979 and continued there for his doctoral degree in chemistry (in 1984) with Peter Dervan. His thesis work focused on the generation and characterization of 1,1-diazenes and the generation of sequence-selective polypyrrole DNA binding/cleaving molecules. He then spent a year at the Massachusetts Institute of Technology with Christopher Walsh before joining the chemistry faculty at the University of California, Berkeley. He became a Principal Investigator of Lawrence Berkeley National Laboratory in 1985 and an investigator of the Howard Hughes Medical Institute in 1994. In 1999, Schultz moved to Scripps Research and also became founding Director of the Genomics Institute of the Novartis Research Foundation (GNF), which was initiated purely as a genomic research outlet of Novartis, but which grew during Schultz's tenure to include a significant drug discovery effort and more than triple the number of intended employees (currently over 500 people). In March 2010, he left GNF to return to the nonprofit sector and, in March 2012, founded the California Institute for Biomedical Research (Calibr), later renamed the Calibr-Skaggs Institute for Innovative Medicines. Schultz was named CEO of Scripps Research in 2015 and President the following year. He has trained over 300 graduate students and postdoctoral fellows, many of whom are on the faculties of major research universities.

== Research ==
=== Combinatorial chemistry and molecular evolution ===
Much of Schultz's work consists of finding ways to do a great many similar experiments at the same time, on many different compounds. He is one of the leading pioneers in combinatorial chemistry, screenable molecular libraries, and "high-throughput" chemistry. His interests are wide-ranging, with applications in such diverse areas as catalytic mechanisms, cell-specialization and other complex biological processes (normally studied by biologists, not chemists), basic photochemistry, biophysical probes of all stripes from NMR through positron-emission, and solid-state materials science.

Early in his career, Schultz showed that the natural molecular diversity of the immune system could be directed to generate catalytic antibodies. This method enabled the subsequent development of many new selective enzyme-like catalysts for reactions ranging from acyl transfer and redox reactions to pericyclic and metalation reactions. Although their catalytic activities are only rarely strong enough to be of practical use, catalytic antibodies have provided important new insights in our understanding of biocatalysis, structural plasticity of proteins, evolution of biochemical function, and the immune system itself.

Schultz then applied molecular diversity—the strategy of creating a large community of different molecules, plus a method for fishing out and identifying the ones that do what you want—to a range of problems in chemistry, biology and materials science. Along with Richard Lerner, he was one of the critical players in the development of phage-display libraries, and surface-library chips. For high-throughput bioassays which require freely soluble test-compounds, he uses microrobotic fluid-manipulation systems, adapted for 1,536-microwell cell-culture plates, to separately treat very small cell colonies with large numbers (hundreds of thousands) of different compounds.

Using these various high-throughput and combinatorial experimental approaches, Schultz has identified materials with novel optical, electronic, and catalytic properties; also, proteins and small molecules which control important biological processes such as aging, cancer, autoimmunity, and stem-cell differentiation and de-specialization back to pluripotency.

=== Expanding the genetic code ===
Schultz has pioneered a method for adding new building blocks, beyond the common twenty amino acids, to the genetic codes of prokaryotic and eukaryotic organisms. This is accomplished by screening libraries of mutant amino acyl tRNA synthetases for mutants which charge nonsense-codon tRNAs with the desired unnatural amino acid. The organism which expresses such a synthetase can then be genetically programmed to incorporate the unnatural amino acid into a desired protein in the usual way, with the nonsense codon now coding for the unnatural amino acid. Normally, the unnatural amino acid itself must be synthesized in the lab and supplied to the organism by adding it to the organism's growth medium. The unnatural amino acid must also be able to pass through the organism's cell membrane into the interior of the organism.

More than 70 unnatural amino acids have been genetically encoded in bacteria, yeast, and mammalian cells, including photoreactive, chemically reactive, fluorescent, spin-active, sulfated, pre-phosphorylated, and metal-binding amino acids. This technology allows chemists to probe, and change, the properties of proteins, in vitro or in vivo, by directing novel, lab-synthesized chemical moieties specifically into any chosen site of any protein of interest.

A bacterial organism has been generated which biosynthesizes a novel, previously unnatural amino acid (p-aminophenylalanine) from basic carbon sources and includes this amino acid in its genetic code. This is the first example of the creation of an autonomous twenty-one-amino-acid organism.

=== Unnatural genetic information ===
Schultz's group has recently created bacteria whose chromosomes include unnatural DNA bases, and bacteria whose chromosomes are hybrids which include both RNA and DNA.

=== Origins of mitochondria ===
In order to probe details of the traditionally accepted hypothesis that mitochondria originated when independent bacteria capable of respiratory (oxygen-dependent) metabolism took up residence inside host cells which had previously only been capable of fermentation (metabolism without using oxygen), and evolved to establish a symbiotic relationship with them, Schultz's group has created bacteria capable of surviving inside yeast cells and maintaining a symbiotic relationship with the host yeast cells by carrying out reactions which the yeast cells cannot catalyze without the bacteria. One goal of this work is to culture the yeast-bacteria hybrids and see whether the bacterial genome evolves to increase the mutual benefits of its chemical interactions with the host cells, as has happened with mitochondria over time.

=== ReFRAME drug repurposing library ===
Schultz and his team at the Calibr-Skaggs Institute for Innovative Medicines recognized that the chemical diversity and known safety profiles of drugs that had previously been tested in humans make them valuable to further explore for other potential therapeutic targets aside from originally intended use. This idea of "drug repurposing" is an appealing strategy for advancing a given drug with less time and resources from a candidate and into clinical application, and led to the creation of the ReFRAME (Repurposing, Focused Rescue, and Accelerated Medchem) drug repurposing library. ReFRAME offers open-access drug repositioning screening of around 13,000 compounds, nearly all of which are small molecules that have reached clinical development or seen significant preclinical profiling.

The library was created by combining three widely used commercial drug databases (Clarivate Integrity, GVK Excelra GoStar, and Citeline Pharmaprojects) along with patent mining of small molecules dosed in humans. One of the library's first major successes screened its collection against Cryptosporidium spp., a major cause of childhood diarrhea in developing countries. The library found two compounds (VB-201 and a structurally related analog of ASP-7962) previously tested in humans for other therapeutic uses that subsequently showed to be effective in animal models of the infection, providing novel candidates.

== Commercial activities ==
Schultz is a founder of several biotechnology startups, including Affymax Research Institute, Symyx Technologies, Syrrx, Kalypsys, Phenomix, Ilypsa, Ambrx, Ardelyx, and Wildcat Discovery Technologies.

== Flywheel for scientific investment ==
At Scripps Research, Schultz has pioneered a "bench-to-bedside" model that is uncommon in the nonprofit research space. Through the establishment of the Calibr-Skaggs Institute for Innovative Medicines and a merger with the Scripps Research Translational Institute, as well as the formation of partnerships with pharmaceutical companies during his time as CEO and President of Scripps Research, Schultz has worked to accelerate fundamental scientific research into drug discovery and real-world medical advances. This model, based on the flywheel effect, has created a self-renewing revenue stream in which novel medicines that arise from the institute's scientific findings lead to revenue that is then reinvested in institute research programs and used to further expand research capabilities. The strategy has helped Scripps Research to overcome the funding challenges typically faced by scientific research institutions.

== Publications and retractions ==
Schultz has authored around 790 papers.

One of his papers in 2013 PNAS about making more stable antibodies was retracted, due to suspect data from co-author Shiladitya Sen:

- Wang, F; Sen, S; Zhang, Y; Ahmad, I; Zhu, X; Wilson, IA; Smider, VV; Magliery, TJ; Schultz, PG (March 12, 2013). "Somatic hypermutation maintains antibody thermodynamic stability during affinity maturation". Proceedings of the National Academy of Sciences of the United States of America. 110 (11): 4261–6. Bibcode:2013PNAS..110.4261W. doi:10.1073/pnas.1301810110. PMC 3600448. PMID 23440204. (Retracted, see doi:10.1073/pnas.1712805114, PMID 28874538, Retraction Watch)

Two papers from his lab published in 2004, one in Science and one in Journal of the American Chemical Society, were retracted in 2009, related to work in the Shultz lab by a postdoc, Zhiwen Zhang, on incorporating non-native glycosylated amino acids into proteins. Had it succeeded, this method could have become an essential tool for investigating the functions of carbohydrate attachments to proteins; however, the work could not be replicated, and when the lab went to find the relevant notebooks, they were missing. In the course of the investigation, Zhang received emails and phone calls blackmailing him, and at one point the person doing this wrote to several institutions and Science saying that he or she was going to commit suicide. The lab eventually identified the problem as a misunderstanding of the function of a key enzyme used in the experiments. The papers were:

- Zhang, Z; Gildersleeve, J; Yang, YY; Xu, R; Loo, JA; Uryu, S; Wong, CH; Schultz, PG (January 16, 2004). "A new strategy for the synthesis of glycoproteins". Science. 303 (5656): 371–3. Bibcode:2004Sci...303..371Z. doi:10.1126/science.1089509. PMID 14726590. S2CID 1048760. (Retracted, see doi:10.1126/science.326.5957.1187-a, PMID 19965450) Retraction notice: Sills, Jennifer; Zhang, Zhiwen; Gildersleeve, Jeff; Yang, Yu-Ying; Xu, Ran; Loo, Joseph A.; Uryu, Sean; Wong, Chi-Huey; Schultz, Peter G. (November 27, 2009). "Retraction". Science. 326 (5957): 1187.1–1187. Bibcode:2009Sci...326.1187Z. doi:10.1126/science.326.5957.1187-a. PMID 19965450.
- Xu, R; Hanson, SR; Zhang, Z; Yang, YY; Schultz, PG; Wong, CH (December 8, 2004). "Site-specific incorporation of the mucin-type N-acetylgalactosamine-alpha-O-threonine into protein in Escherichia coli". Journal of the American Chemical Society. 126 (48): 15654–5. Bibcode:2004JAChS.12615654X. doi:10.1021/ja044711z. PMID 15571382. (Retracted, see doi:10.1021/ja906705a, PMID 19731911)

== Awards ==
Schultz is a member of the American National Academy of Sciences (1993), and the Institute of Medicine of the National Academy of Sciences (1998).

- 2024 American Institute of Chemists Gold Medal
- 2022 A.J. Scott Medal for Excellence in Biological Chemistry Research
- 2021 National Academy of Sciences Award in Chemical Sciences
- 2019 Tetrahedron Prize
- 2016 Heinrich Wieland Prize
- 2015 Honorary doctorate from Yale University
- 2013 American Association for the Advancement of Science
- 2013 The Laureate Chemistry for the Future Solvay Prize
- 2006 ACS Arthur C. Cope Award
- 2003 Paul Ehrlich and Ludwig Darmstaedter Prize
- 1995 Honorary doctorate from Uppsala University, Sweden
- 1994 Wolf Prize in Chemistry
- 1990 ACS Award in Pure Chemistry
- 1988 NSF Alan T. Waterman Award
- 1985 Presidential Young Investigator Award, National Science Foundation
- 1985 Nobel Laureate Signature Award, American Chemical Society
