= Joshua Sanes =

American neurobiologist (born 1949)

Joshua R. Sanes
- Born: 1949 (age 76–77); Buffalo, New York
- Education: Yale University
- Scientific career
- Fields: Molecular biology, cellular biology, neurobiology
- Workplaces: Harvard University; University of California at San Francisco; Washington University in St. Louis

Joshua R Sanes (born 1949) is an American neurobiologist who is known for his contributions to the understanding of synapse development. Throughout his career, Sanes has been the recipient of various awards and honors, including membership in the U.S. National Academy of Sciences. His research involves an interdisciplinary approach which focuses mainly on the formation of synapses at the neuromuscular junction by combining the sciences of psychology, chemistry, biology, and engineering to study these circuits and employing molecular and genetic imaging to understand their function. Sanes currently lives in Boston, Massachusetts with his wife, Susan, and their two children.

== Early life and education ==
Sanes was born in Buffalo, New York in 1949. Sanes' father owned an automobile parts store, and his mother attended school to become a speech pathologist. His father and mother both loved to read and so they kept plenty of books around the house. This is what sparked Sanes interest in the brain at a young age, since popular books during the 1950s included those on psychology. During high school, this interest led him to work in a laboratory at the Buffalo Children's Hospital under the microbiologist Robert Guthrie. They studied mental illnesses as it relates to bacteria. In addition to his laboratory work, as a student at Williamsville South Highschool, Sanes was editor of the school's newspaper, played cello in the orchestra, and was president of the Model U.N.

== Academic career and work ==
Sanes graduated from Yale in 1970 with degrees in Biochemistry and Psychology. He then went on to Harvard to earn his doctorate in Neurobiology in 1976. After he finished his doctorate, he left Harvard to pursue his interest in health policy in Washington, D.C., in the Office of Technology Assessment.

After a year working for the U.S. Congress, Sanes wanted to continue his career studying neurobiology. He completed his postdoctoral work at the University of California at San Francisco, and then spent over 20 years, from 1980 until 2004, working as a member of the faculty of Washington University School of Medicine in the department of physiology. In 2004, he moved to Harvard, and became the Director of the Center for Brain Science. He is currently a professor of Molecular and Cellular Biology at Harvard University.

== Research ==
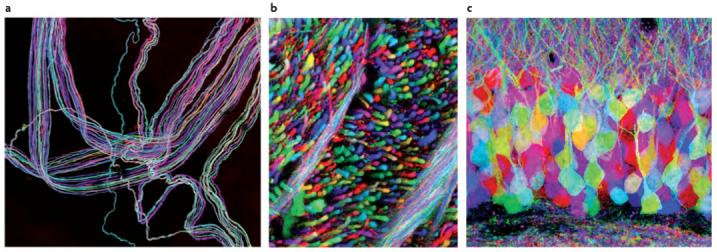
Brainbow

Professor Sanes' early research focused on the NMJ (neuromuscular junction); he was in particular interested in a protein that emanated from the motor neuron, agrin. With the aid of agrin-knockout mice, he and his co-workers showed a particular form of agrin was required for formation of the NMJ. Professor Sanes' later research has focused on synapses that connect nerve cells and the function and formation of them. In particular, his work has been critical in understanding brain disorders. An important discovery he made in the field of neuroscience earlier in his career were the signals discovered in the extracellular matrix that were found to be crucial in organizing the synapse. That led to his most notable development, the creation of the brainbow mouse. This allowed his laboratory to fluorescently trace synapses with markers to yield high-quality, vivid images of brain activity. These brainbow line images have been examined around the world to determine specific neuronal pathways within the mosaic of neuron tangles in the brain. Additionally, over his career, Sanes has been a part of hundreds of published papers involving the study of synapses from molecular and embryological perspectives. Most recently, Sanes lab is studying the function of neuronal circuits specifically in the retina. This plays an important role in visual processing.

== Awards and honors ==
Sanes has received many awards and honors throughout his career studying synapses and their function and formation. He is also known for his work as a mentor and teacher in the scientific community.

- Member of the U.S. National Academy of Sciences
- Fellow of the American Association for the Advancement of Science and of the American Academy of Arts and Sciences
- Received the Alden Spencer Award of Columbia University in 2000
- Recipient of the 2017 Gruber Neuroscience Prize
- 2019 Cowan Award for contributions in developmental neuroscience
- Awarded the Edward M. Scolnick Prize in Neuroscience
- Awarded Honorary Doctorate Degree by Hebrew University in Jerusalem
- 2025 Foreign Member of the Royal Society

In addition to various awards, Sanes also served on several advisory boards and committees, which included ones for the Max-Planck Institute, the Howard Hughes Medical Institute, the Wellcome Trust, and the National Institutes of Health. He served on the National Advisory Council of the National Institute of Neurological Diseases and Stroke, the Council of the Society for Neuroscience, the Muscular Dystrophy Association, the Klingenstein Neuroscience Fund, the Amyotrophic Lateral Sclerosis (ALS) Association, the Stowers Institute, and the Searle Scholars Fund.
