= Susumu Kitagawa =

Japanese chemist

Susumu Kitagawa FRS
- 北川 進
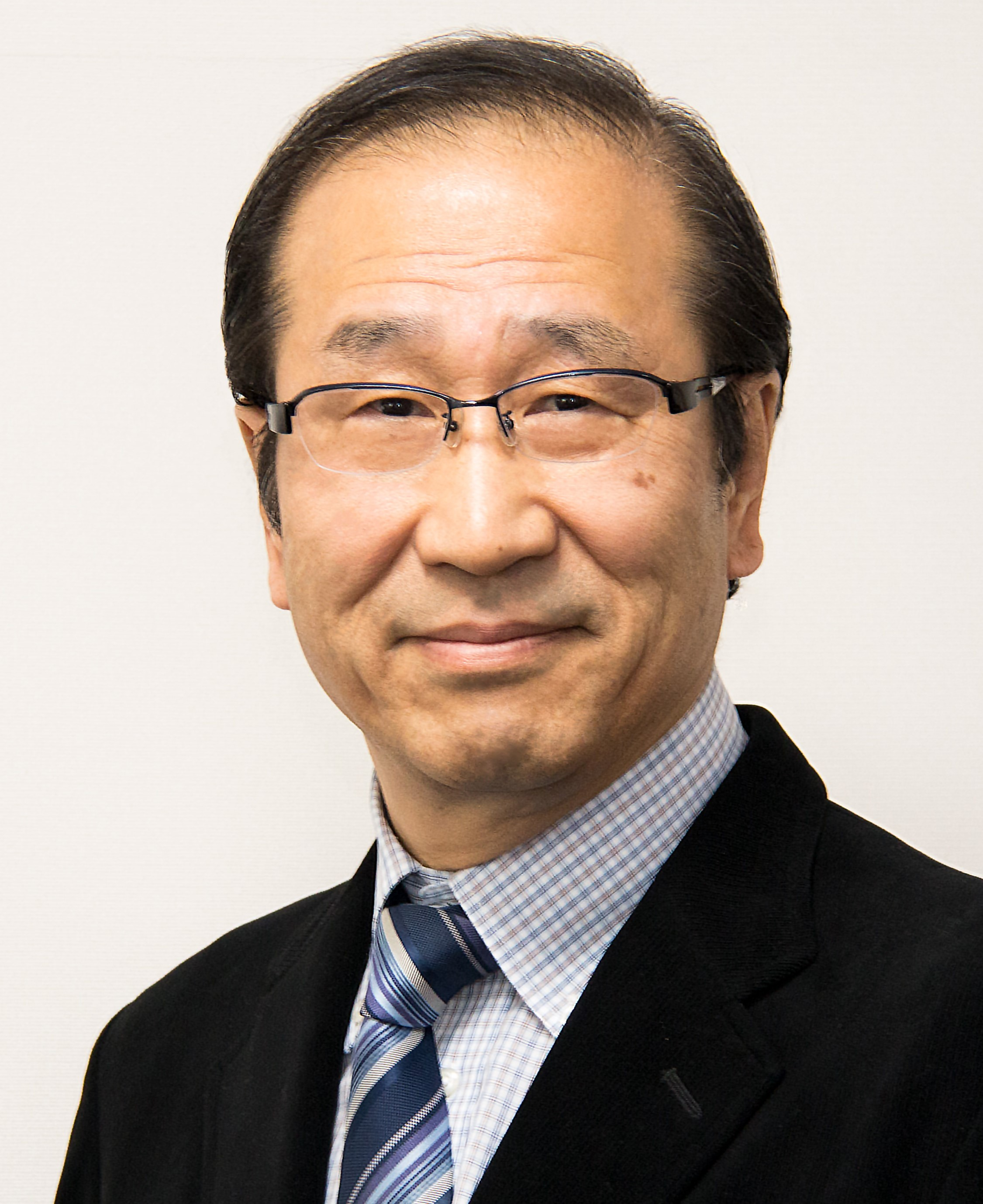
- Born: July 4, 1951 (age 74); Kyoto, Japan
- Education: Kyoto University (BS, PhD)
- Known for: Metal-organic frameworks
- Awards: Humboldt Research Prize (2008); Thomson Reuters Citation Laureates (2010); Medal with Purple Ribbon (2011); De Gennes Prize (2013); Japan Academy Prize (2016); Nobel Prize in Chemistry (2025)
- Scientific career
- Fields: Chemistry
- Institutions: Kyoto University
- Website: Official website

Susumu Kitagawa FRS (北川 進, Kitagawa Susumu; born 4 July 1951) is a Japanese Nobel Prize-winning chemist specializing in coordination chemistry, with a focus on organic–inorganic hybrid compounds and the chemical and physical properties of porous coordination polymers, particularly metal-organic frameworks. He is Distinguished Professor at Kyoto University's Institute for Integrated Cell-Material Sciences (iCeMS), which he co-founded. In 2025, he was awarded the Nobel Prize in Chemistry jointly with Richard Robson and Omar M. Yaghi.

== Life ==
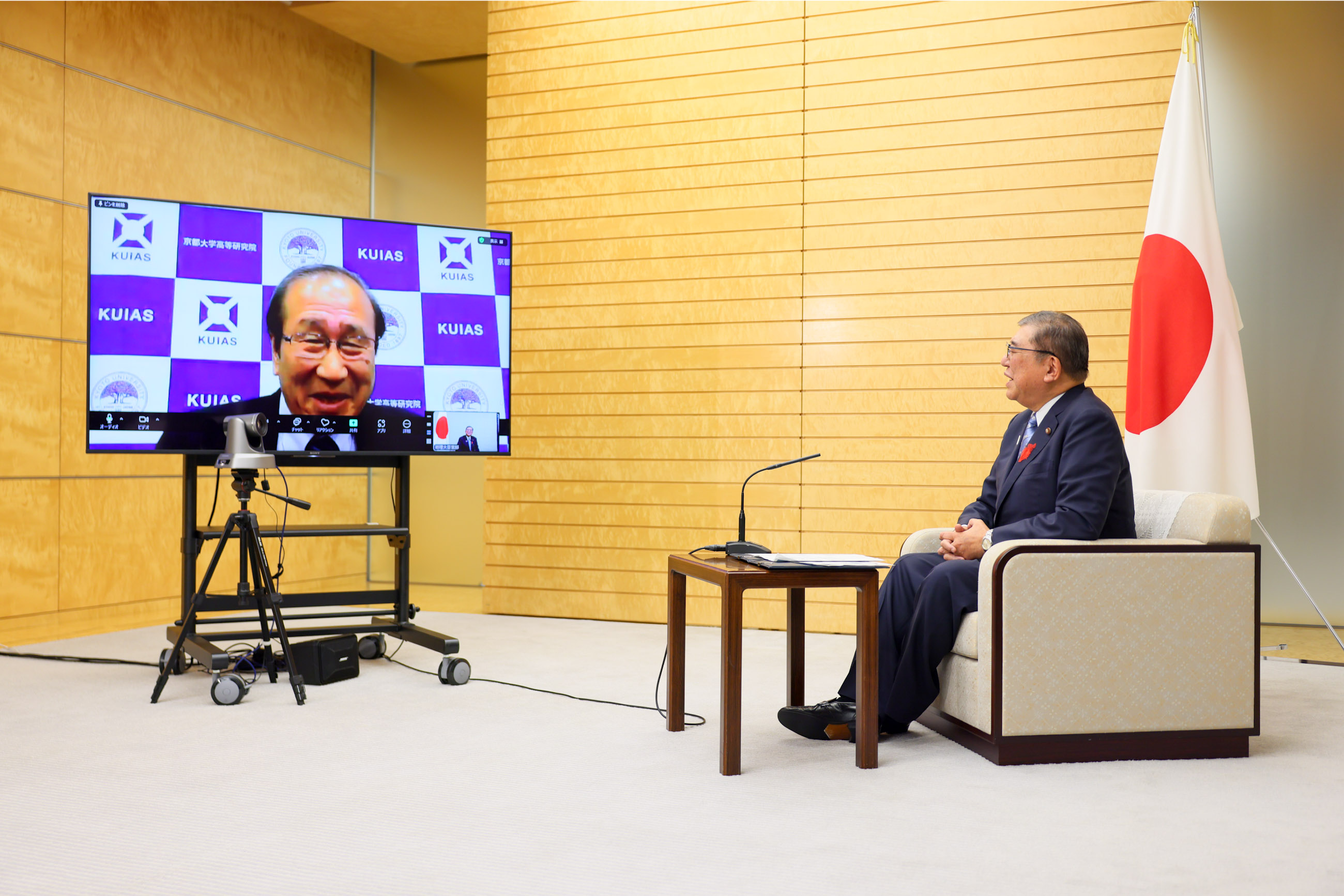
Kitagawa attended an online meeting with Shigeru Ishiba (October 9, 2025)

Kitagawa was born on 4 July 1951 in Kyoto.

He earned his PhD in hydrocarbon chemistry from Kyoto University in 1979, having completed his undergraduate studies at the same institution. That year, he was appointed assistant professor at Kindai University, where he was promoted to lecturer in 1983 and associate professor in 1988.

In 1992, he became professor of inorganic chemistry at Tokyo Metropolitan University. He returned to Kyoto University in 1998 as a professor of inorganic functional chemistry in the Department of Synthetic Chemistry and Biological Chemistry. In 2007, he co-founded the Institute for Integrated Cell-Material Sciences (iCeMS), serving as founding deputy director, then as director from 2013 to 2023. In 2024, he was appointed Executive Vice-President for Research Promotion at Kyoto University.

His overseas academic postings include a postdoctoral fellowship at Texas A&M University with F. Albert Cotton (1986–1987) and a guest professorship at the City University of New York (1996). He received an honorary doctorate from the Technical University of Munich in 2018.

Kitagawa served as a member and associate member of the Science Council of Japan from 2011 to 2023.

In 2025, Kitagawa, along with Richard Robson and Omar M. Yaghi, was awarded the Nobel Prize in Chemistry for their foundational work on molecular building blocks for metal-organic frameworks.

== Research ==
Following the discoveries of Makoto Fujita (1994) and Omar M. Yaghi (1995), Kitagawa demonstrated in 1997 that coordination polymer structures possess gas adsorption properties, a key finding for the development of functional porous materials.

His most influential works include:

- A 1997 seminal report on a porous coordination polymer (MOF) for small molecule adsorption.
- A 2004 early review of functional porous coordination polymers.
- A 2009 review of "soft porous crystals," which feature large-scale structural transformability upon chemical or physical stimulation.

== Awards ==
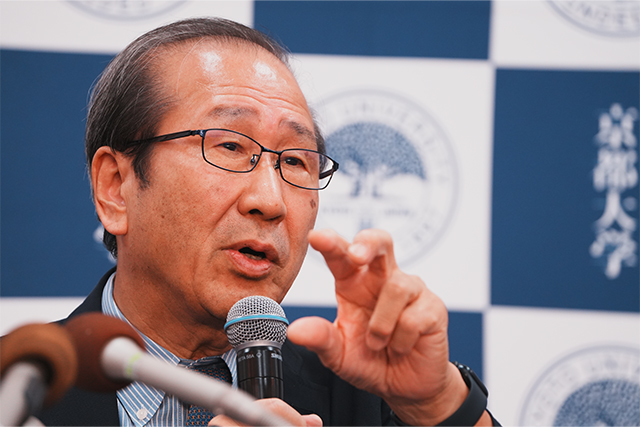
Kitagawa attended a press conference at Kyoto University after the Nobel Prize laureates were announced on October 3, 2025

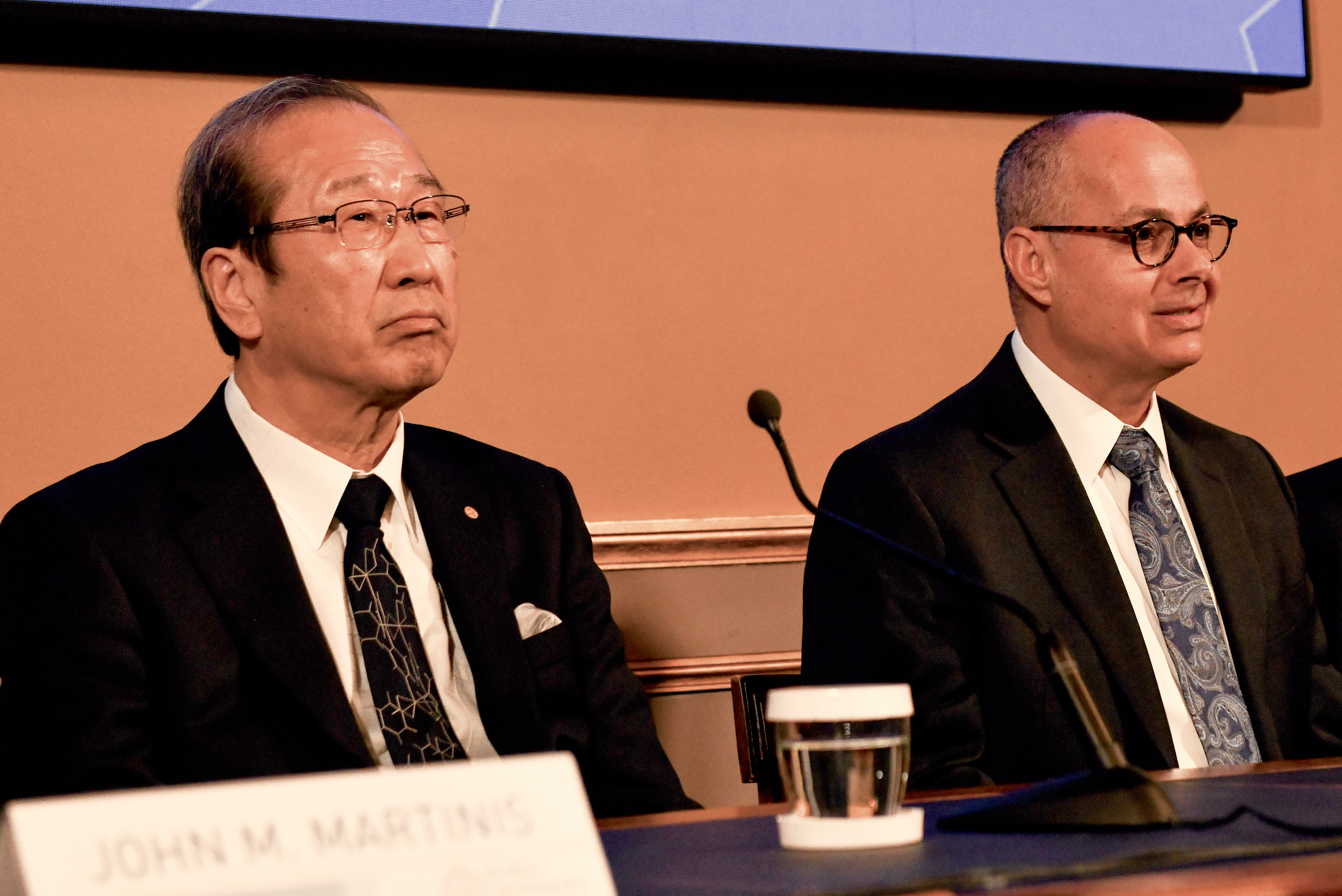
Kitagawa with Omar Yaghi

- 2003 – Chemical Society of Japan (CSJ) Prize for Creative Work
- 2008 – Humboldt Research Prize
- 2009 – Chemical Society of Japan Award
- 2010 – Thomson Reuters Citation Laureates
- 2011 – Medal with Purple Ribbon
- 2013 – De Gennes Prize
- 2016 – Japan Academy Prize
- 2016 – Fred Basolo Medal, Northwestern University
- 2017 – Chemistry for the Future Solvay Prize
- 2017 – Fujihara Award, The Fujihara Foundation of Science
- 2019 – Grand Prix de la Fondation de la Maison de la Chimie
- 2019 – Emanuel Merck Lectureship
- 2019 – Member of the Japan Academy
- 2023 – Fellow of the Royal Society
- 2025 – Nobel Prize in Chemistry
- 2025 – Person of Cultural Merit
- 2025 – Order of Culture
