= Solvay S.A. =

Belgian chemical company

Solvay NV/SA
- Type: Public
- Traded as: Euronext Brussels: SOLB; BEL 20 component CAC Mid 60 component
- ISIN: BE0003470755
- Industry: Chemicals
- Founded: 1863; 163 years ago
- Founder: Alfred and Ernest Solvay
- Headquarters: Neder-Over-Heembeek, Brussels, Belgium
- Key people: Pierre Gurdijan (Chairman), Philippe Kehren (CEO)
- Products: Chemicals
- Revenue: €10.3 billion (2018); €8.9 billion (2020); €4.880 million (2023)
- Operating income: €278 million (2023)
- Net income: €618 million (2020) €2,105 million (2023)
- Total assets: €22,000 million (2018); €7,5 billion (2024)
- Total equity: €10,624 million (2018); €2,105 million (2023)
- Number of employees: 9 000 (2024)
- Website: solvay.com

Solvay is a Belgian-French multinational chemical company established in 1863, with its headquarters located in Neder-Over-Heembeek, Brussels, Belgium. Since the end of 2023, following its demerger with the creation of the new Syensqo entity, Solvay has specialized in essential chemistry and employs over 9,000 people in 40 countries.

In 2023, Solvay reached €4,880 million in revenues and €1,246 million of underlying EBITDA.

Solvay is listed on Euronext Brussels.

== History ==
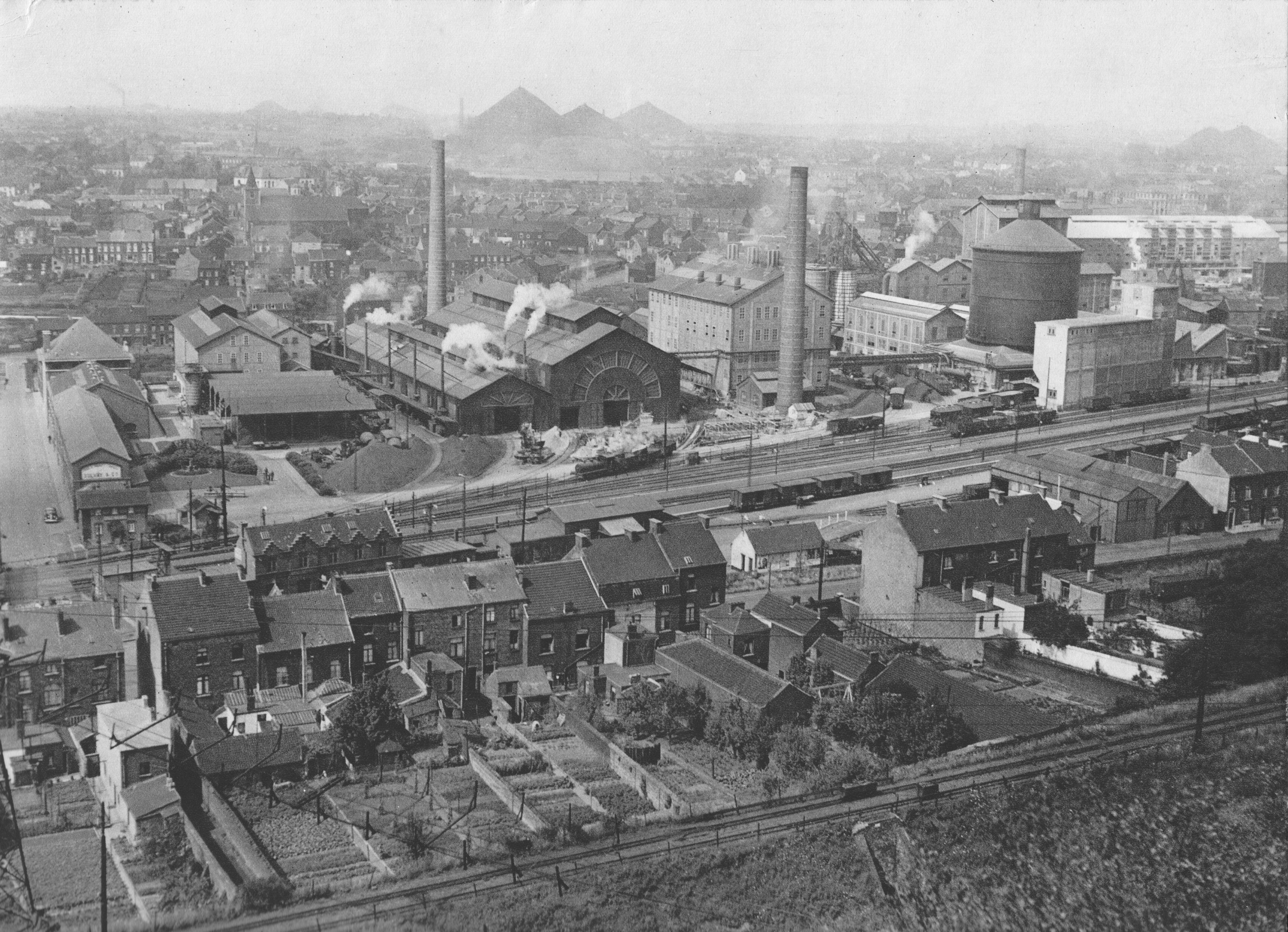
The historic establishment in Couillet, Belgium

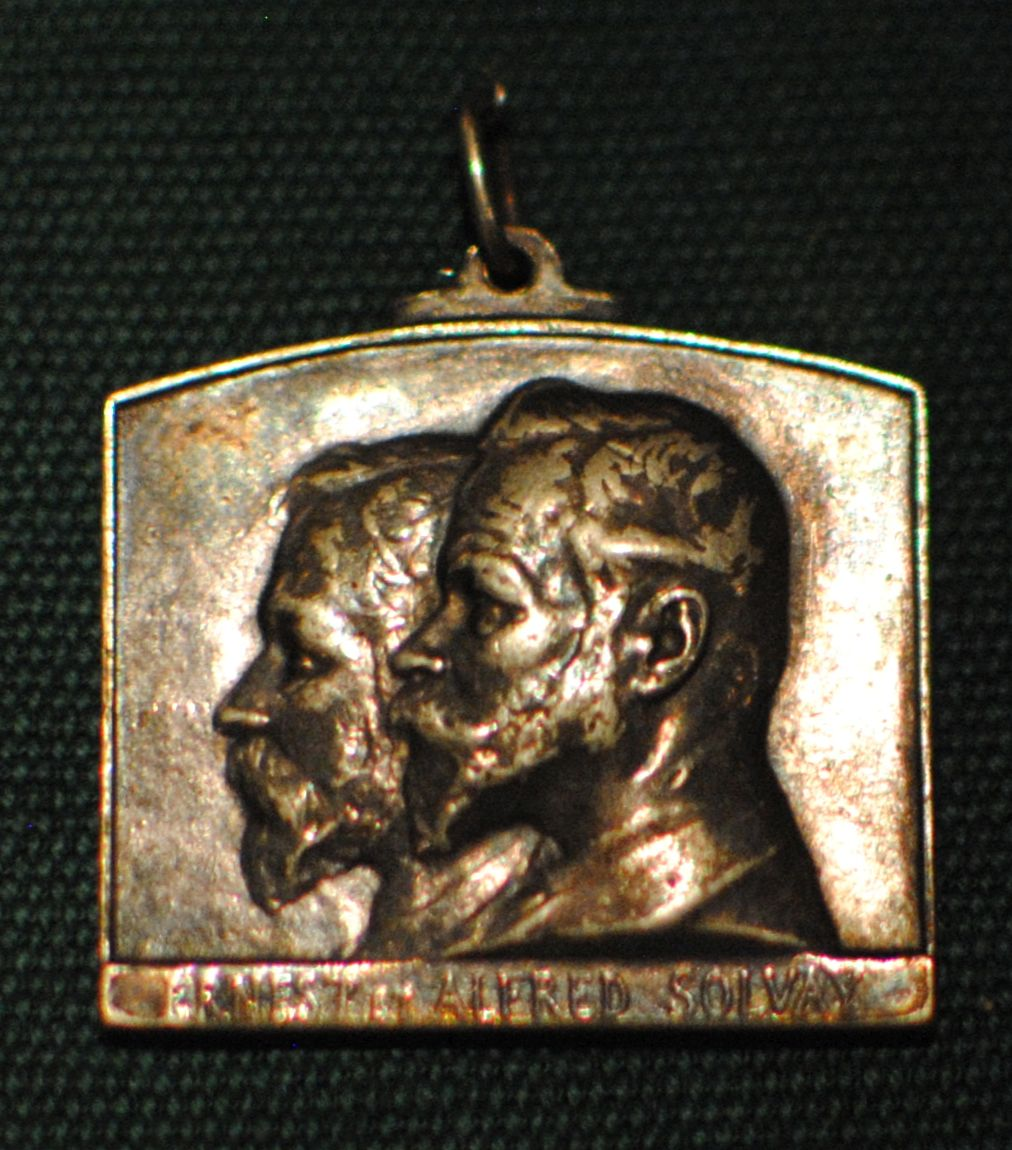
Medal cast in 1913 to commemorate the 50th anniversary of Solvay and Company. Text (in French) reads "Ernest et Alfred Solvay".

=== The evolution of Solvay ===
Founded in 1863, by Ernest Solvay and his brother Alfred Solvay to produce sodium carbonate by the Solvay process, the company has diversified into two main sectors of activity: chemicals and plastics. Before World War I, Solvay was the largest multinational company in the world. It was formerly also active in pharmaceuticals, but agreed to sell that entire division to Abbott Labs for €4.5 billion in September 2009, a deal was completed in February 2010.

In April 2011, the firm agreed to the €3.4 billion acquisition of French-based chemicals company Rhodia which was completed in September 2011.

Since January 2012, the new Solvay has been listed on the NYSE Euronext in Paris and joined the CAC 40 index in September 2012. Solvay is historically listed on the NYSE Euronext in Brussels and part of BEL20 index.

The company is a supporter of the Solvay Conferences that were started by Ernest Solvay in 1911.

On December 3, 2015, Solvay launched a share issue sent to existing shareholders, completing funding for the $5.5 billion purchase of Cytec Industries Inc.

=== Recent activities and markets ===
On December 8, 2023, shareholders approved the plan to spin off Solvay into two independent, publicly listed companies: Solvay and Syensqo. Solvay retained its essential chemistry activities and employs 9,000 people and generates an annual turnover of €4.88 billion.
The aim of the separation was to provide each company with the independence and flexibility to pursue distinct strategies. The traditional chemical activities, such as soda, hydrogen peroxide and adhesives, will continue under the Solvay name and will be led by Philippe Kehren. The other activities, such as plastics for electronics and rechargeable batteries, have been transferred to a new company called Syensqo (pronounced: science-co), with Ilham Kadri as chairman, who was previously Solvay's General Manager since 2019.

Syensqo began its specialty chemicals activities with 13,200 employees and an annual turnover of €7.9 billion. On Monday, December 11, Syensqo shares were listed on the stock exchange and are included in the BEL 20 share index.

In 2024, Solvay announced its plan to supply Europe with rare earth metals for permanent magnets used in EVs and wind turbines from its refurbished plant in France.

== Corporate affairs ==
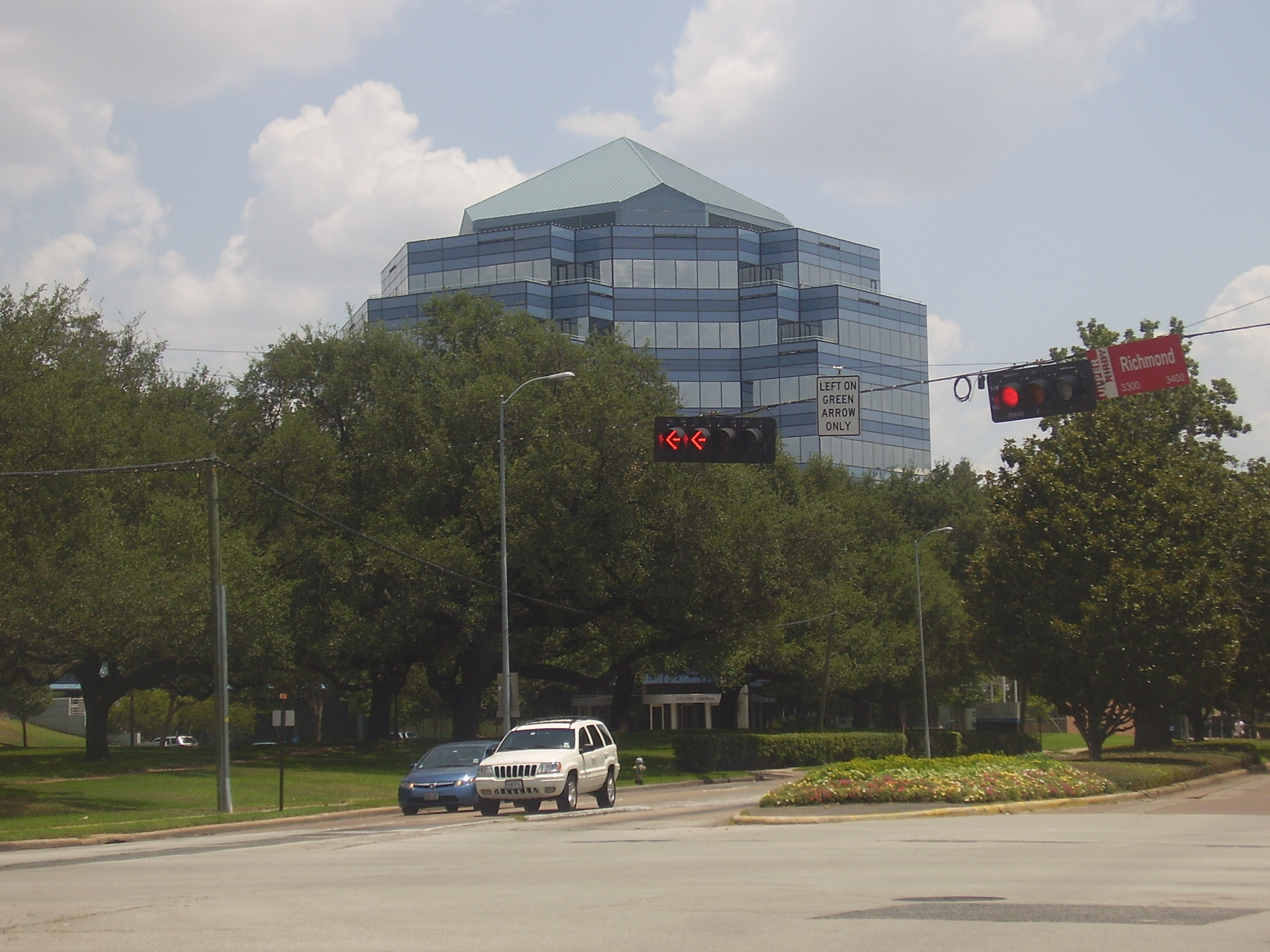
Solvay America offices in Houston, Texas

The company's head office is located in Brussels, Belgium. It was previously in Ixelles, Brussels.

Solvay has several subsidiaries in the world. Its United States subsidiary, Solvay America, Inc., is based in Houston, Texas. Solvay also has a subsidiary in Ontario, Canada. The company is also present in Asian countries like Singapore and Indonesia, in Latin America (Brazil, Mexico, etc.) and in Europe (France, Italy, Portugal, etc.).

== Executive committee ==
- Philippe Kehren : Chief Executive Officer;
- Alexandre Blum : Chief Financial Officer;
- Lanny Duvall : Chief Operations Officer;
- Dr. Mark van Bijsterveld : Chief People Officer;
- Lisa Brown : General Counsel and Corporate Secretary.

== Products ==
Solvay is a main partner of Solar Impulse and has contributed research and development resources to their solar powered airplane project. That aircraft conducted its first test flight on 3. December 2009, and since then has made solar-powered flights from Switzerland to Spain and Morocco in 2012.

In 2015–2016, Solar Impulse 2 flew around the world, the first such journey by a solar-powered aircraft.

=== Fuel cell technology ===
SolviCore, a joint venture by Umicore and Solvay in the field of fuel cells is already pre-marketing membrane-electrode assemblies for different types of fuel cells for portable or mobile use. New generation lithium batteries for hybrid vehicles components make use of Solvay fluorinated polymers in order to reduce carbon dioxide emissions.

=== Soil remediation ===
Novosol is a sodium bicarbonate-based process for treating and recovering mineral residues contaminated with heavy metals.

=== Renewable feedstock ===
Solvay is working on the development and industrialization of the proprietary Epicerol process for manufacturing epichlorohydrin from natural glycerin.

== Legal affairs ==
In 2020, Solvay Specialty Polymers USA, now Syensqo, was the subject of litigation for its contaminating water sources and soil with per- and polyfluoroalkyl substances (PFAS). PFAS, a group of more than 4,000 compounds used in nonstick cookware, stain-resistant fabrics, firefighting foam and a range of other products, do not break down in the environment, and therefore accumulate in the body. They have been linked to cancer, fertility problems, liver damage, high cholesterol, and other health problems.

In November 2020, the New Jersey Attorney General announced its filing of two lawsuits "to compel the clean-up of contamination and recover Natural Resource Damages (NRDs)", one of which is against Solvay Specialty Polymers USA, LLC and Arkema Inc., alleging they are "two companies responsible for widespread contamination from toxic per- and polyfluoroalkyl substances (PFAS) emanating from a Gloucester County facility, which has contaminated public drinking water in the region." This is part of an ongoing and growing investigation.

Solvay impeded the availability of an analytical standard by legal maneuver.

In 2021, Delaware has reached an agreement with Solvay Specialty Polymers. Although Solvay denies any responsibility, the agreement mandates a thorough environmental investigation under the supervision of the DNREC to assess the extent of the contamination. Initial tests did not reveal any immediate health risks for local residents.

== See also ==
- Solvac
- List of companies of Belgium
