= Pygmygoby =

Pygmygoby or pygmy goby can refer to members of goby genera characterized by their small sizes. These include:

- Eviota
- Knipowitschia
- Pandaka
- Trimma
- Trimmatom

== See also ==
- Dwarfgoby
- Pandaka pygmaea, the dwarf pygmy goby
