= Dwarfgoby =

Dwarfgoby or dwarf goby may refer to Gobiidae genera of small fishes, including Eviota, Knipowitschia, Pandaka, Trimma and Trimmatom.

== See also ==
- Pandaka pygmaea, the dwarf pygmy goby
