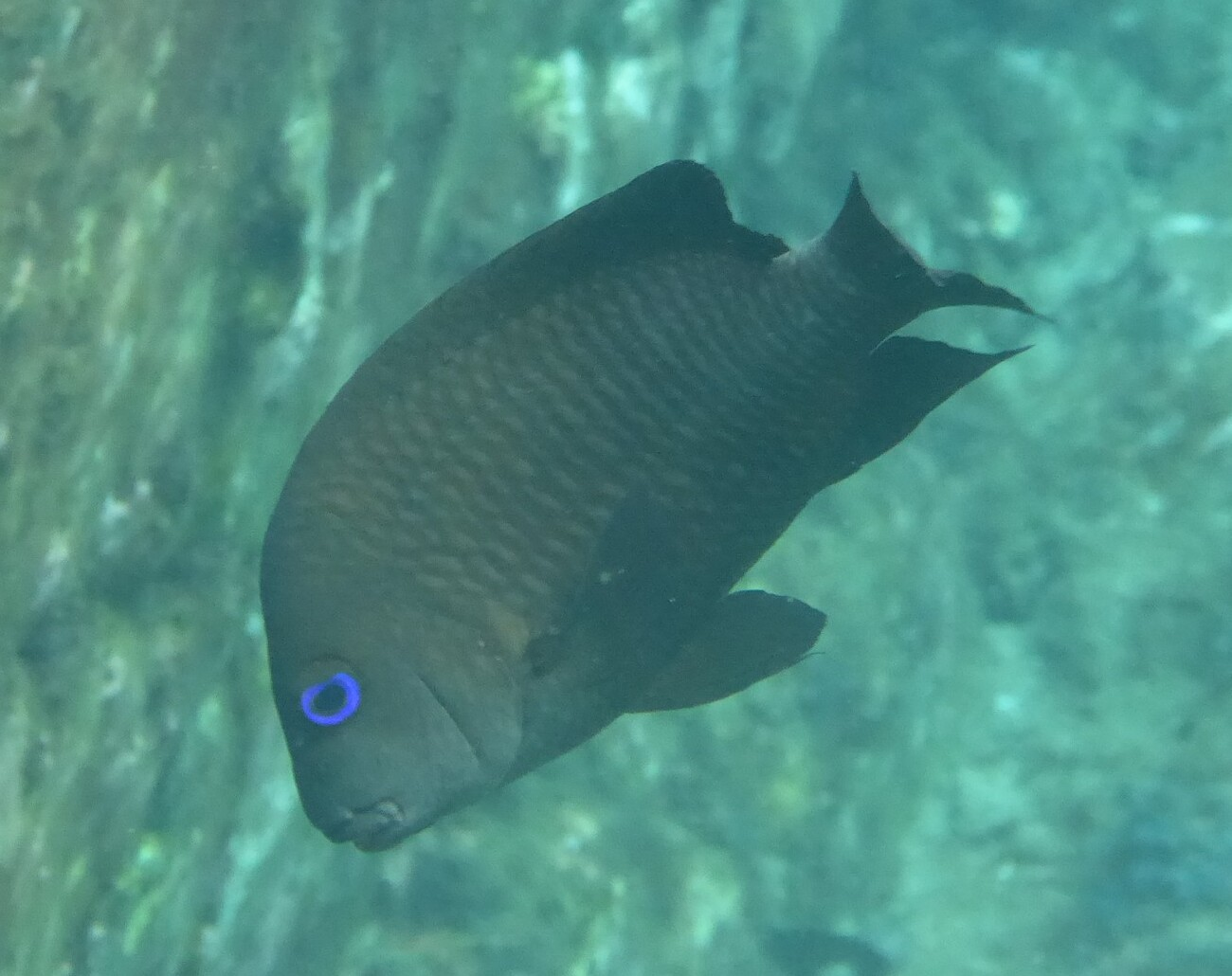

Conservation status
- Least Concern (IUCN 3.1)

Scientific classification
- Kingdom: Animalia
- Phylum: Chordata
- Class: Actinopterygii
- Order: Blenniiformes
- Family: Pomacentridae
- Genus: Microspathodon
- Species: M. frontatus

Binomial name
- Microspathodon frontatus Emery, 1970

= Microspathodon frontatus =

Species of fish

Microspathodon frontatus (Guinean damselfish), is a species of ray-finned fish from the family Pomacentridae, the clownfishes and damselfishes. It is found in the eastern Atlantic Ocean off west Africa in the Gulf of Guinea as far north as Ghana as well as the islands of Bioko and São Tomé and Príncipe where it is abundant. It is found among rocky reefs, rocks and rubble. Like other damselfish this species forms pairs for breeding, the eggs stick to the substrate and are guarded and aerated by the males.
