= T. nanus =

T. nanus may refer to:

- Taoniscus nanus, the Dwarf Tinamou, a bird species
- Trimmatom nanus, a marine fish species
- Turnix nanus, the Black-rumped Buttonquail, a bird species
- Tylognathus nanus, a synonym for Hemigrammocapoeta nana, a ray-finned fish species found in Israel, Jordan and Syria

== See also ==
- Nanus (disambiguation)
