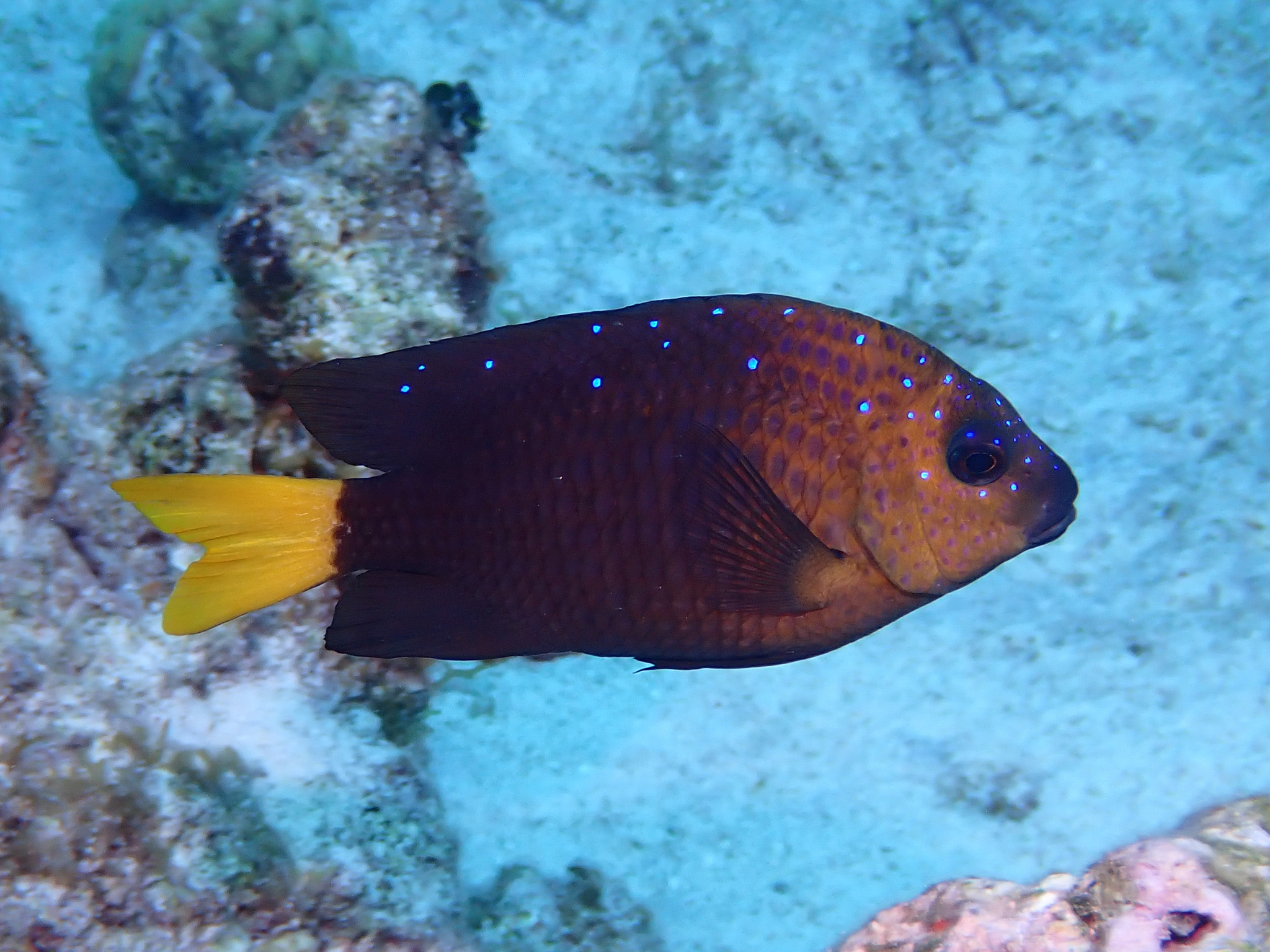
- Microspathodon chrysurus

Scientific classification
- Domain: Eukaryota
- Kingdom: Animalia
- Phylum: Chordata
- Class: Actinopterygii
- Order: Blenniiformes
- Family: Pomacentridae
- Subfamily: Pomacentrinae
- Genus: Microspathodon; Günther, 1862

Type species
- Glyphisodon chrysurus Cuvier, 1830

Synonyms
- Azurella D.S. Jordan, 1919; Centrochromis Norman, 1922; Pomataprion Gill, 1863

= Microspathodon =

Genus of fishes

Microspathodon is a genus of fish in the family Pomacentridae.

== Species ==
There are four species in the genus:

Species	Image
Microspathodon bairdii (Gill, 1862)	
Microspathodon chrysurus (Cuvier in Cuvier and Valenciennes, 1830)	
Microspathodon dorsalis (Gill, 1862)	
Microspathodon frontatus Emery, 1970	
