= Trimma panemorfum =

Scientific classification
- Domain: Eukaryota
- Kingdom: Animalia
- Phylum: Chordata
- Class: Actinopterygii
- Order: Gobiiformes
- Family: Gobiidae
- Genus: Trimma
- Species: T. panemorfum

Binomial name
- Trimma panemorfum R. Winterbottom & Pyle, 2022

Species of fish

Trimma panemorfum is a species of goby from the deep reefs around 91.4 meters (300 ft) at the Uchelbeluu Reef in Palau in the western Pacific Ocean.
