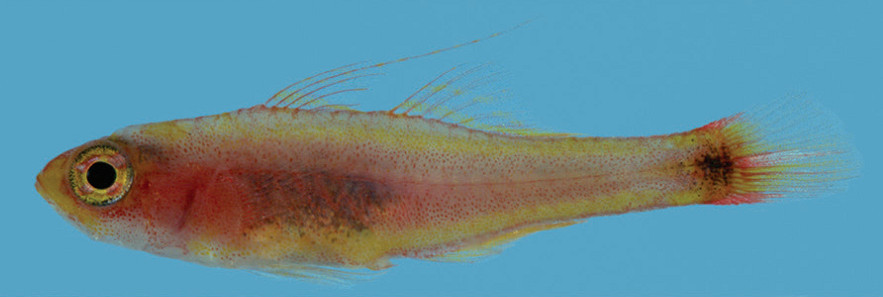
- Female from New Caledonia, 22.6 mm (0.89 in)
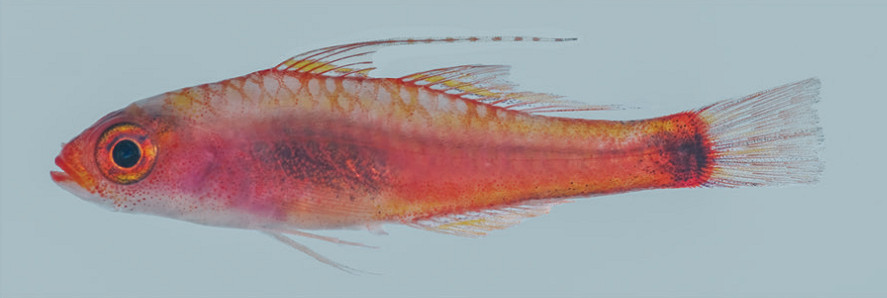
- Female from Kepotsol Island, Raja Ampat Islands, 19.5 mm (0.77 in)

Conservation status
- Least Concern (IUCN 3.1)

Scientific classification
- Kingdom: Animalia
- Phylum: Chordata
- Class: Actinopterygii
- Order: Gobiiformes
- Family: Gobiidae
- Genus: Trimma
- Species: T. nasa

Binomial name
- Trimma nasa Winterbottom, 2005

= Trimma nasa =

Species of fish

Trimma nasa, commonly called the nasal dwarfgoby or nasal pygmy goby, is a species of goby from the Western Pacific. They are small fish, averaging at around 2 cm (0.79 in) in length. They are bright orange and transparent yellow in life, with a white stripe running down from between the eyes to the upper lip and a dark brown spot at the base of the tail fin. They are usually found in large schools in the sloping or vertical drop-offs at coral reef edges.

== Taxonomy ==
Trimma nasa belongs to the Trimma nasa species group of the dwarfgoby genus Trimma. It was included in the true goby subfamily Gobiinae in the goby family Gobiidae. However, the 5th Edition of Fishes of the World does not give any subfamilies in the Gobiidae. It was first recognized as a separate species in 2005 by the ichthyologist Richard Winterbottom. The type specimens were collected from Siquijor Island in the Philippines. Though specimens of this species have been recovered previously, they were misidentified with Griffiths' dwarfgoby (Trimma griffithsi).

The generic name Trimma is derived from Greek τρίμματος (trimmatos, "something crushed"). The specific name is derived from English "nasal [helmet]" in reference to the stripe on the snout.

== Description ==
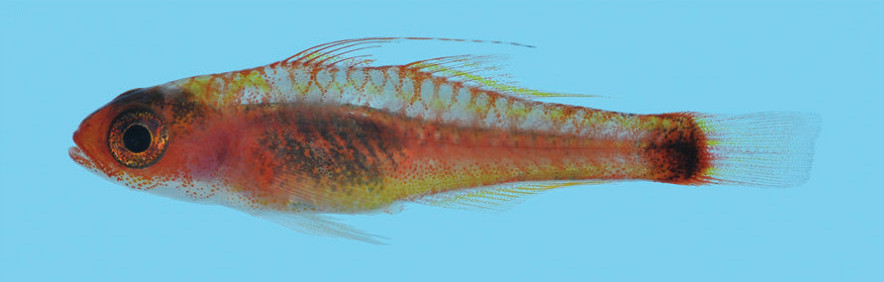
Female from Rabaul, New Britain, 16.7 mm (0.66 in)

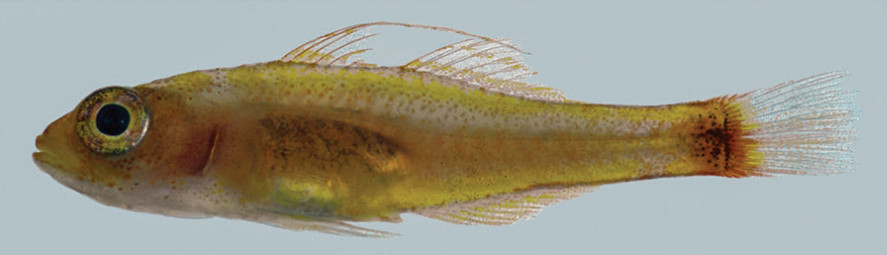
Female from the Uchelbeluu Reef, Palau, 16.5 mm (0.65 in)

Like other dwarfgobies, the nasal dwarfgoby are typically very small fish. Maximum recorded lengths are 2.3 cm (0.91 in) for males, and 2 cm (0.79 in) for females. The space between the two eyes (interorbital) is about the same width as the eyeballs. The dorsal (back) fin has seven spines and eight soft rays. The anal fin has one spine and seven to nine soft rays. The fifth and usually fourth ray of the pelvic fin branches into two. The caudal (tail) fin is squarish (truncate) in shape. Two rows of scales are present in front of the pelvic fin. Scales are absent on the cheeks.

In life, the body is transparent yellow with bright orange abdominal cavity lining and iridescent blue and green highlights on the fins. There is a large dark brown spot at the base of the tail fin. There is usually a thin white stripe (dark in preserved specimens) on the snout, running from the upper lip to the area between the eyes. It overlies a rounded hump, also from the upper lip to just before the eye orbits. This is the source of their specific name, since it resembles the projecting bar of medieval nasal helmets.

== Distribution ==
Nasal dwarfgobies can be found in the Western Pacific coral reefs usually at depths of 0 to 20 m (0 to 66 ft), though they have been known to reach 41 m (135 ft) below the water's surface. They have been recorded in Australia (including the Great Barrier Reef), Fiji, Indonesia, New Caledonia, Palau, Papua New Guinea, the Philippines, the Solomon Islands, and Vanuatu.

== Ecology ==
Nasal dwarfgobies generally congregate in large, loose schools near coral reef drop-offs pockmarked by caves or recesses. They may school together with related species like the blue-striped cave goby (Trimma tevegae). They usually orient themselves vertically with their heads facing upwards along the coral reef wall and presumably feed on zooplankton traveling down the water column. When threatened they will quickly retreat inside hiding places.

Nasal dwarfgobies are very short-lived. The maximum recorded age is only 87 days. Of this, around 34 days are spent as pelagic larvae which is 39% of the total lifespan (in contrast to less than 1% for the vast majority of other reef fish species). They have high mortality rates, averaging at 4.7% per day.

Their mating behavior has not been studied, but females are usually larger than males and more numerous (at a ratio of 1 male per 1.6 females). Since no specimens with intermediate gonad morphologies have been collected thus far, it is likely that they are not hermaphroditic as some other goby species are.

They have also been observed sheltering in the tentacles of the giant reef corallimorph (Paracorynactis hoplites), with no apparent adverse effects from the stinging cells.

== Importance ==
Nasal dwarfgobies are not fished for food by humans. However, like other dwarfgobies in the genera Trimma and Eviota, they may occupy a valuable trophic role in the reef ecosystems due to their short lifespans and thus higher biomass generation rates.

== See also ==
- Eviota sigillata (adorned dwarfgoby), with the shortest known lifespan among vertebrates
