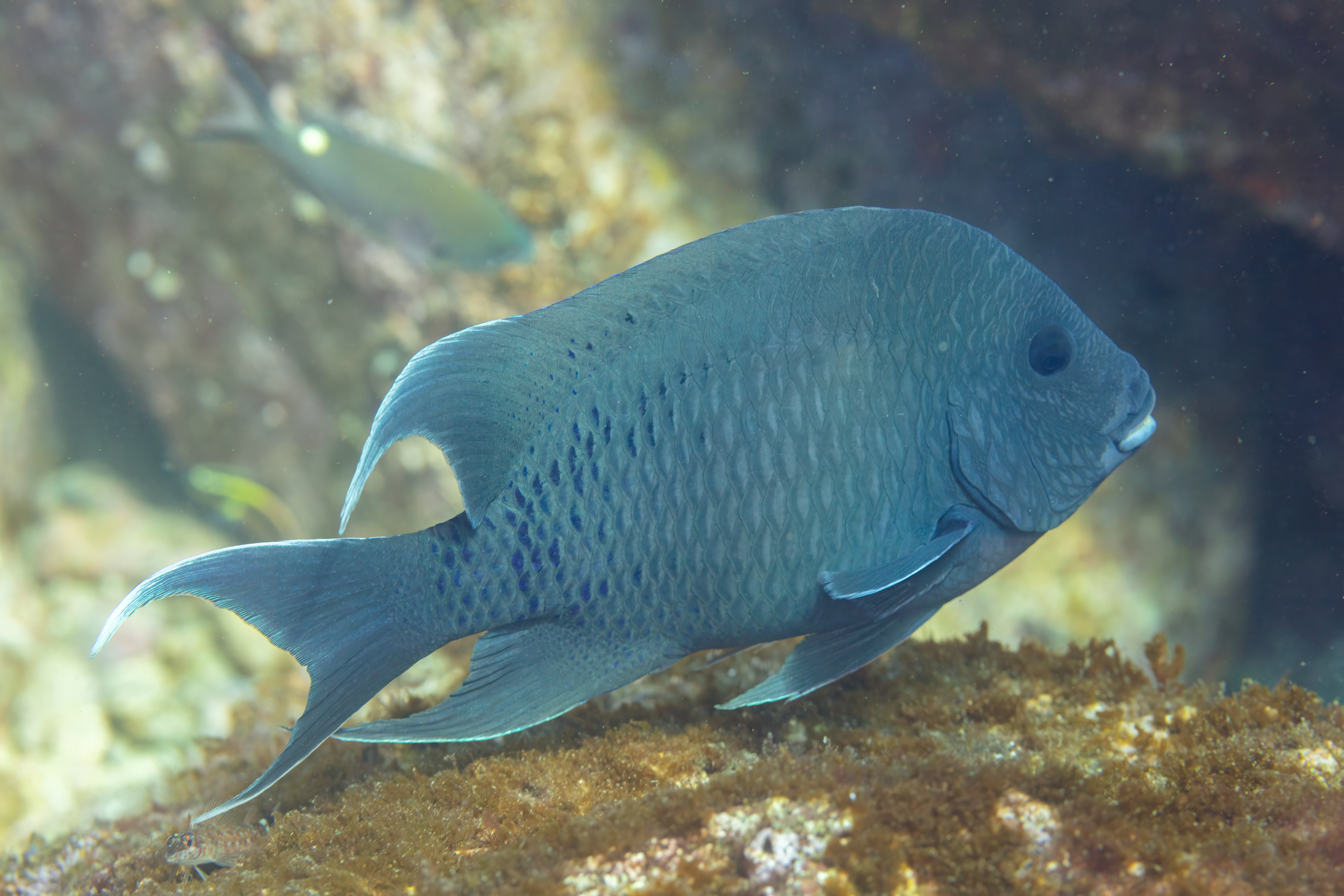

Conservation status
- Least Concern (IUCN 3.1)

Scientific classification
- Kingdom: Animalia
- Phylum: Chordata
- Class: Actinopterygii
- Order: Blenniiformes
- Family: Pomacentridae
- Genus: Microspathodon
- Species: M. dorsalis

Binomial name
- Microspathodon dorsalis (Gill, 1862)

Synonyms
- Hypsypops dorsalis Gill, 1862; Microspathodon azurissimus Jordan & Starks, 1895; Microspathodon cinereus Gilbert, 1890; Pomacentrus quadrigutta Gill, 1862

= Giant damselfish =

Species of fish

The giant damselfish (Microspathodon dorsalis) is a species of fish that inhabits rocky reefs below the surf zone at depths of 1–25 m. It mainly feeds on low-profile, attached algae. Giant damselfish defend both feeding and reproductive territories by driving off other fishes and divers who come too close. They are oviparous, and form distinct pairings during breeding. The eggs are demersal and adhere to the substrate. Males guard and aerate the eggs.

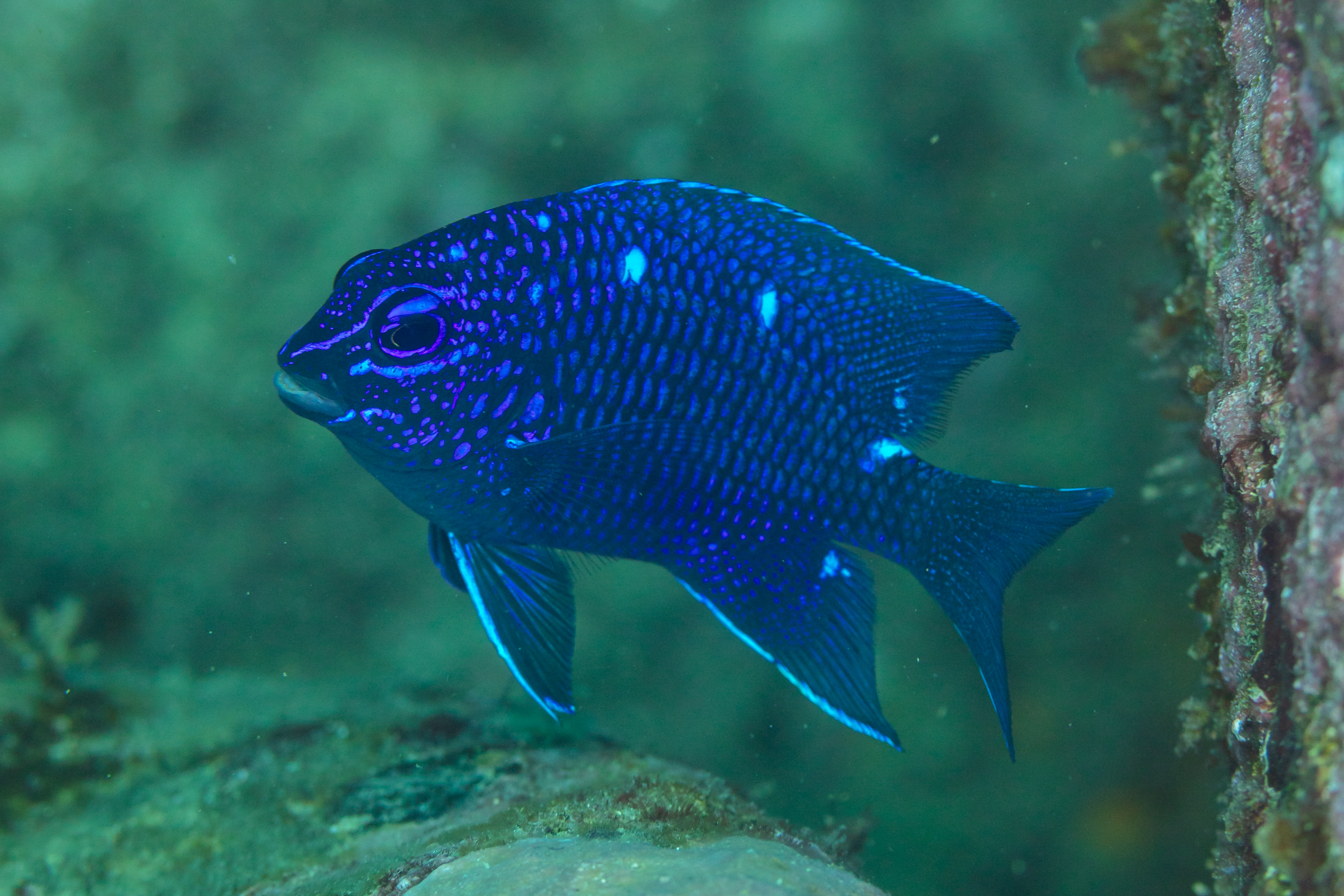
Juvenile

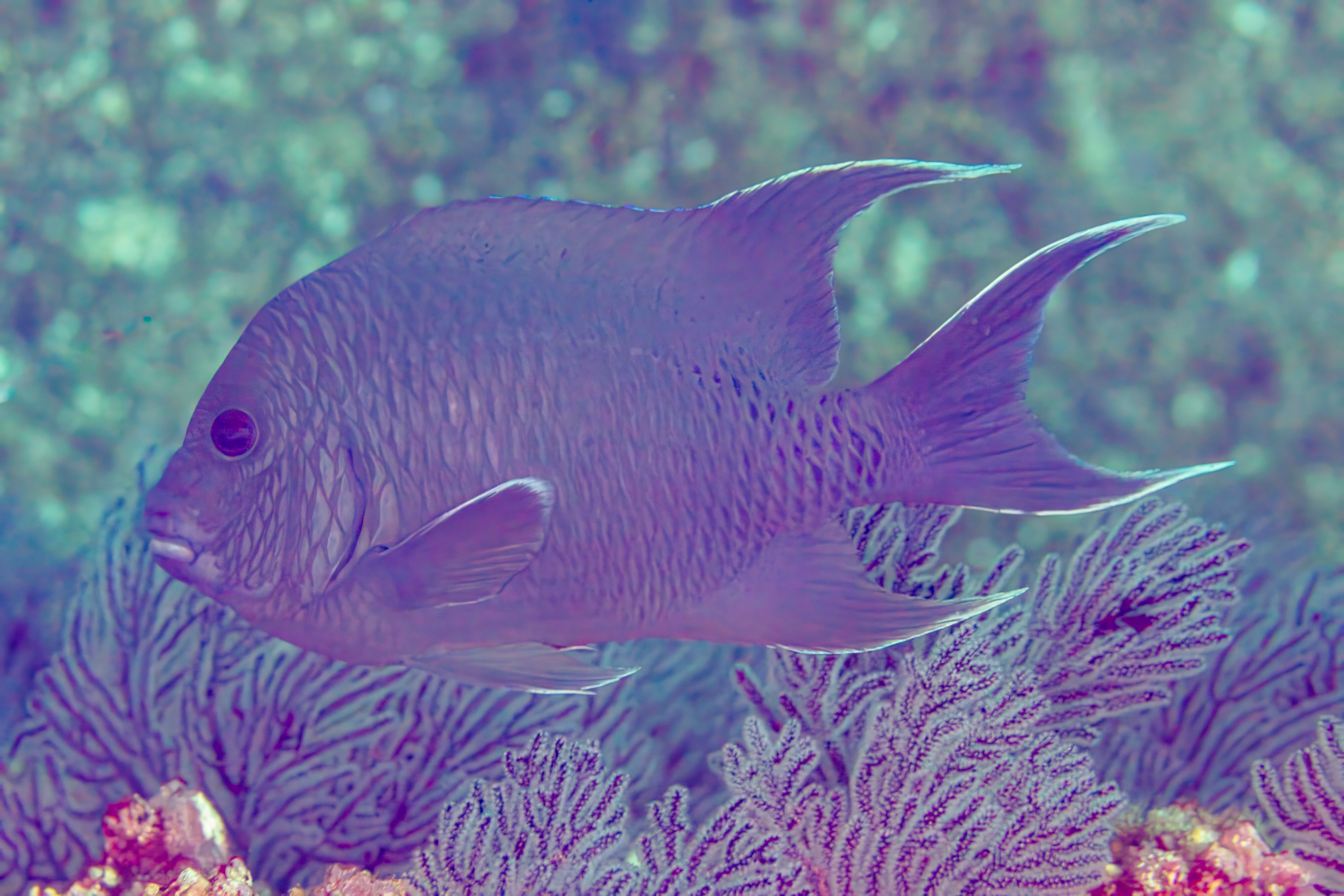
Adult

== Distribution ==
Eastern Pacific Ocean: central Gulf of California to Malpelo Island (Colombia), including the Revillagigedo, Cocos Island and the Galápagos Islands.

== Gallery ==
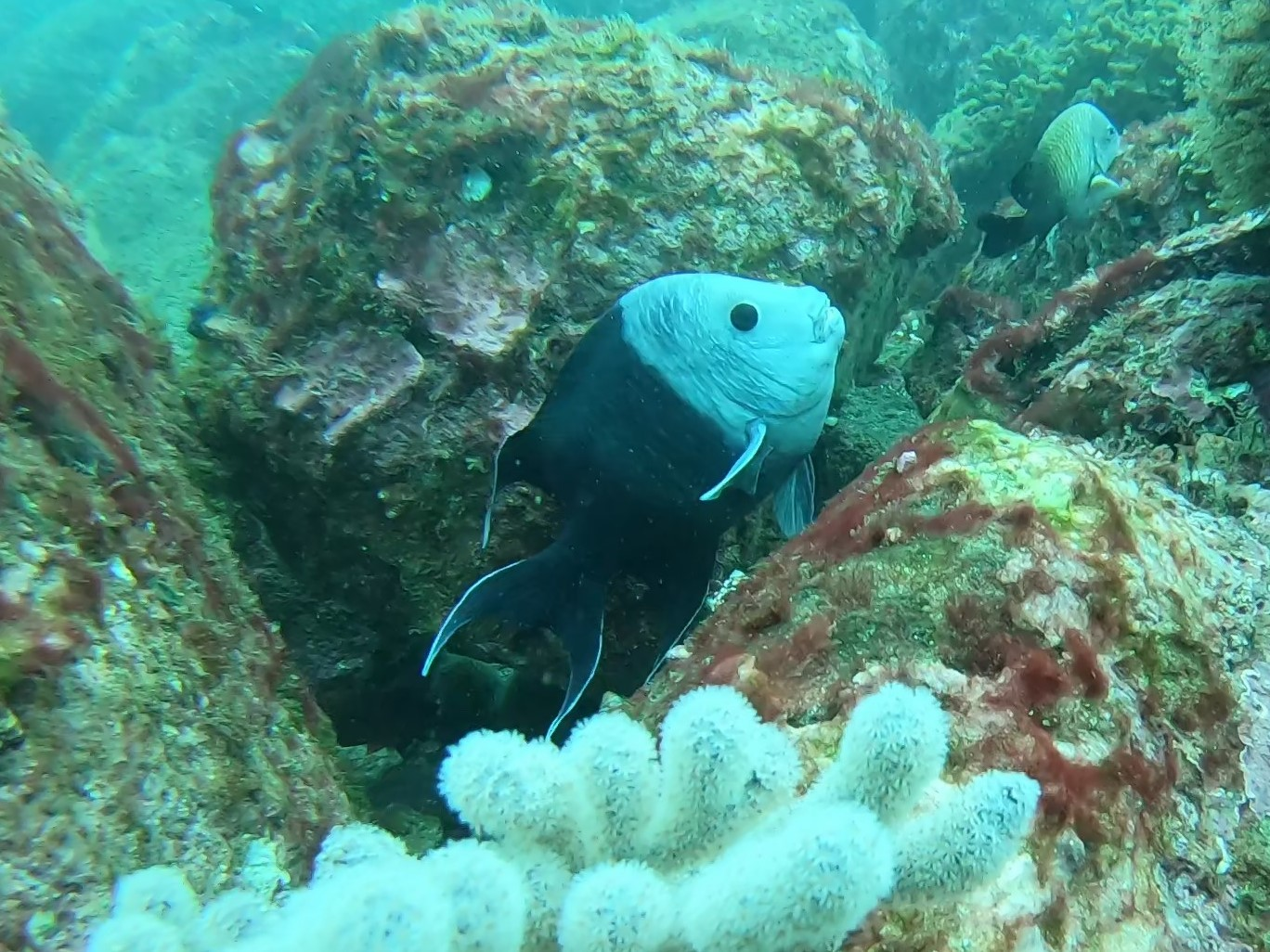
Male in breeding colouration

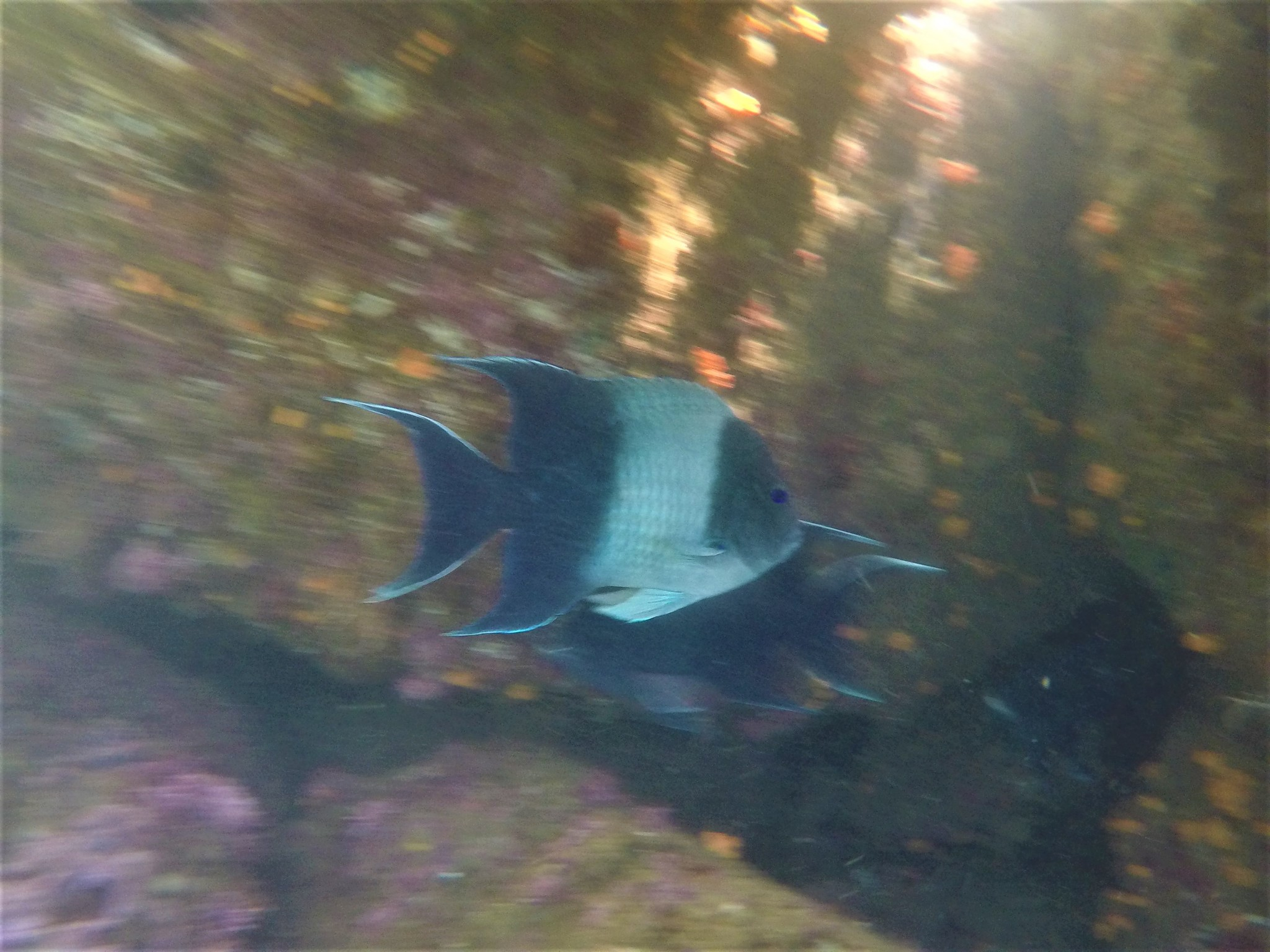
