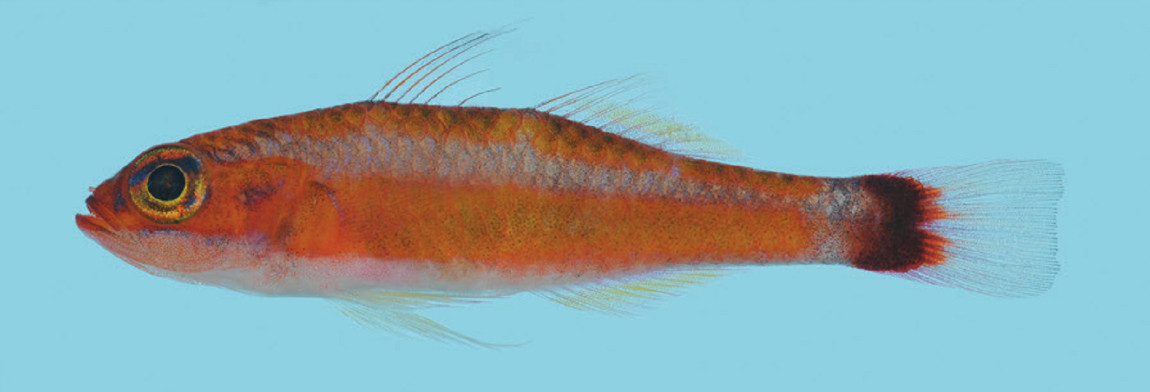
- Male from Rabaul, New Britain, 21.5 mm (0.85 in)

Scientific classification
- Kingdom: Animalia
- Phylum: Chordata
- Class: Actinopterygii
- Order: Gobiiformes
- Family: Gobiidae
- Genus: Trimma
- Species: T. caudomaculatum

Binomial name
- Trimma caudomaculatum Yoshino & Araga, 1975

= Trimma caudomaculatum =

Species of fish

Trimma caudomaculatum, the blotch-tailed pygmygoby , is a species of goby from the Western Pacific. Like other members of the genus, they are usually found in large schools in the sloping or vertical drop-offs at coral reef edges. Similar to other species of Trimma, this species consists of multiple cases of bidirectional sex change, meaning that if a group is lacking in a specific sex a partial amount of the group can change their undeveloped gonad structure of the opposite sex in order to accommodate. This sex change is made possible due to the females having a developed set of ovaries with female hormones that are developed, and a set of testis and male hormones that are underdeveloped; The males follow a similar set up in vice versa, so their testis and male hormones are developed, while the ovaries and female hormones are underdeveloped.

== Taxonomy ==
Trimma caudomaculatum belongs to the Trimma tevegae species group of the dwarfgoby genus Trimma. It was included in the true goby subfamily Gobiinae in the goby family Gobiidae. However, the 5th Edition of Fishes of the World does not give any subfamilies in the Gobiidae. It was first described as Trimma caudomaculata (in error) by the Japanese ichthyologists Tetsuo Yoshino and Chūichi Araga from specimens recovered from southern Japan.

In 2005, the ichthyologist Richard Winterbottom examined specimens of Trimma caudomaculatum (specific name corrected for gender agreement) and compared them with specimens of Trimma tevegae. Based on morphology, he concluded that they belonged to the same species, and thus synonymized Trimma caudomaculatum into Trimma tevegae. However, he reversed this opinion after a 2011 phylogenetic study on the genus Trimma. Trimma caudomaculatum is now again considered to be a separate valid species, though still closely related to Trimma tevegae. The study also revealed that Trimma tevegae may be a cryptic species complex.

== Distribution ==
Trimma caudomaculatum can be found in the Western Pacific coral reefs. Specimens have been recovered from Japan and Palau.
