= Viola R. MacMillan =

Canadian mineral prospector (1903–1993)

- Born: Violet Rita Huggard; 23 April 1903; Dee Bank, Ontario, Canada
- Died: 26 August 1993 (aged 90)
- Occupations: Stenographer, miner, prospector, lobbyist
- Spouse: George MacMillan
- Status: Pardoned
- Conviction: Stock manipulation (1968)
- Criminal charge: Stock manipulation
- Penalty: Eight months prison

Violet Rita "Viola" MacMillan (née Huggard; 23 April 1903 – 26 August 1993) was a Canadian mineral prospector and mining financier. During her career, she was one of few women in the mining industry, was the first female member and, later, president of the Prospectors and Developers Association of Canada, and the first woman inducted into the Canadian Mining Hall of Fame.

== Early life ==
Violet Rita Huggard was born in Windermere, Ontario. Her father, Thomas Francis Huggard (1853–1926), was a farmer and an early mail coach driver, and her mother, Harriet "Hettie" Spiers (1866–1957), daughter of George Spiers (1832–1919) and Jane Sheffield Spiers (1834–1907), was a native of Allensville, Ontario. Spiers proved herself to be a capable, enterprising woman who, along with farming and raising 14 children, became a self-educated and respected midwife in the small town of Dee Bank, Ontario, three miles outside of Windermere, in the District of Muskoka, Canada.

Huggard wed his first wife, Mary Anne Goldsmith (1856–1881), on February 25, 1874, in Collingwood, Ontario. The couple had three children, Lily Ann, Mary Elizabeth (known as "Lizzie"), and John Wesley, before her death and burial at Ufford Methodist cemetery. Goldsmith died less than a month following John's birth, who was subsequently raised by his maternal grandparents, James Goldsmith (1811–1885) and Elizabeth Hall Goldsmith (1827–1908), and became known mainly by their surname.

Huggard and Spiers married March 29, 1885, and their children were: William George, Harriet Jane, Bertie, Joseph R, Rebecca May, James, Vada, Minnie Hazel, Sarah Daisy, Viola Rita (aka Reta), Gordon Edward, and Reginald Lewis, with several of them favouring their middle names for common usage. Rebecca and Minnie died during early childhood. MacMillan was the thirteenth of fifteen children born to a hard-working, but impoverished family whose son, Joseph "Joe" Huggard, in 1922, inspired his young sister's interest in mining when he escorted her on an incognito tour of Coniagas Mine, where he worked during the Cobalt silver rush.

== Marriage ==
In 1923, she married George Alexander MacMillan (c. 1899 – 1978) at the age of 20. George's father, Richard, and his uncle, a prospector known as "Black Jack" MacMillan, had taught him basic mineral mining in his youth and, in 1926, George and Viola became involved in mining due to his aging uncle's need to service his existing claims while in declining health. George's bachelor uncle, John "Black Jack" MacMillan, is sometimes misreported as having been his father.

== Career ==
MacMillan started her working career as a stenographer at a law firm in Windsor, Ontario. Eventually she split her time working as a stenographer in the winter and a part-time prospector the remainder of the year. MacMillan is noted for the discovery of the Hallnor deposit as part of the second wave of the Porcupine Gold Rush. MacMillan was also responsible for the development of the Canadian Arrow open pit gold deposit. When prospecting in Quebec MacMillan had to have her husband file her mining claims, as women were legally prohibited. She found major gold deposits in the Kirkland Lake area, northern Quebec, and British Columbia, and staked major uranium claims in northern Saskatchewan.

== Prospectors and Developers Association of Canada ==
MacMillan was credited with the development of the Prospectors and Developers Association of Canada (PDAC) into a professional organisation. George MacMillan was elected president in 1941 with Viola elected as Secretary-Treasurer. In 1942, she organised a full day's convention complete with guest speakers, a dinner, and a dance for 150 people. She introduced a one dollar membership fee to fund the budget of the organisation. She was a lobbyist of the Canadian government getting beneficial legislation such as the Emergency Gold Mining Act, 1948 for the PDAC.

== Windfall Oils and Mines scandal ==
In the summer of 1964, George and Viola MacMillan had staked the Windfall claim in north eastern Ontario near Timmins, Ontario. Stock was issued on the Toronto market as Windfall Oils and Mines. In late winter 1964, Texas Gulf Sulphur geologists working near Timmins found a copper-silver-zinc ore body worth an estimated $2 billion. In July 1965, rumours circulated in Toronto that the Texas Gulf Sulphur ore body reached the MacMillan's claim. MacMillan was at the centre of the Windfall gold mining stock scam that effectively killed off, at least temporarily, the Toronto Stock Exchange as a global mining financial centre. When assays showed the Windfall claims contained very little gold, the stocks collapsed, wiping out many investors and sparking a massive Ontario Securities Commission (OSC) investigation of mine financing in Toronto.

== Conviction and imprisonment ==
The MacMillans were not charged in the Windfall scandal. However, the OSC investigation uncovered instances of wash trading. In 1968, MacMillan was convicted and jailed for eight months for manipulating the price of gold mining stocks on the Toronto Stock Exchange. After her release, MacMillan quietly returned to prospecting and mining ventures. In 1978, Viola MacMillan applied for and received a full pardon from the federal government.

== Philanthropy ==
MacMillan spent the last few years of her life engaged in philanthropy. She donated $1.25 million to the acquisition fund of the Canadian Museum of Nature for the purchase of the "Pinch Collection". William Pinch, over the course of fifty years, had accumulated one of the world's most important mineral collections. It was purchased by the museum for $5 million in 1989. MacMillan also donated several Group of Seven art pieces to Rideau Hall.

== Honours ==
Being the single largest contributor to the museum's acquisition fund, the Canadian Museum of Nature named the "Viola MacMillan Mineral Gallery" in her honour.

She was appointed a Member of the Order of Canada 21 October 1992. MacMillan received her investiture 21 April 1993.

In 1991, Viola MacMillan became the first woman inducted into the Canadian Mining Hall of Fame.

== Death ==
MacMillan died 26 August 1993. The bulk of her estate was distributed to charities, universities, and hospitals in 1998. Members of her family received nothing.

== Bibliography ==
- Bourrie, Mark. Flim Flam: Canada's greatest frauds, scams, and con artists, Toronto: Hounslow Press, 1998. ISBN 0-88882-201-4
- MacMillan, Viola. From the Ground Up, 1992.
- McCreery, Christopher. The Order of Canada: its origins, history, and developments, University of Toronto Press, 2005.
- Prospectors and Developers Association of Canada (PDAC) main page: http://www.pdac.ca/pdac/about/pdac-brief-history.pdf
