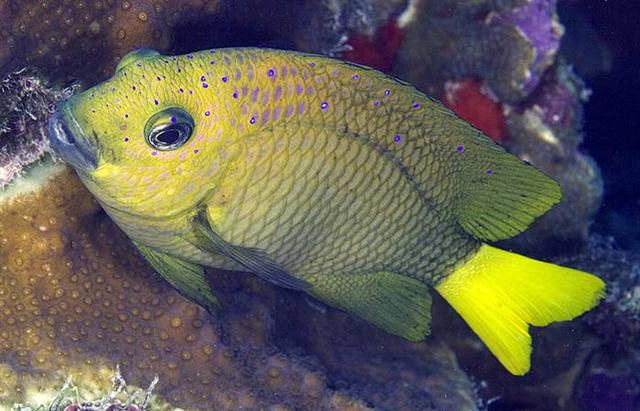
- Adult
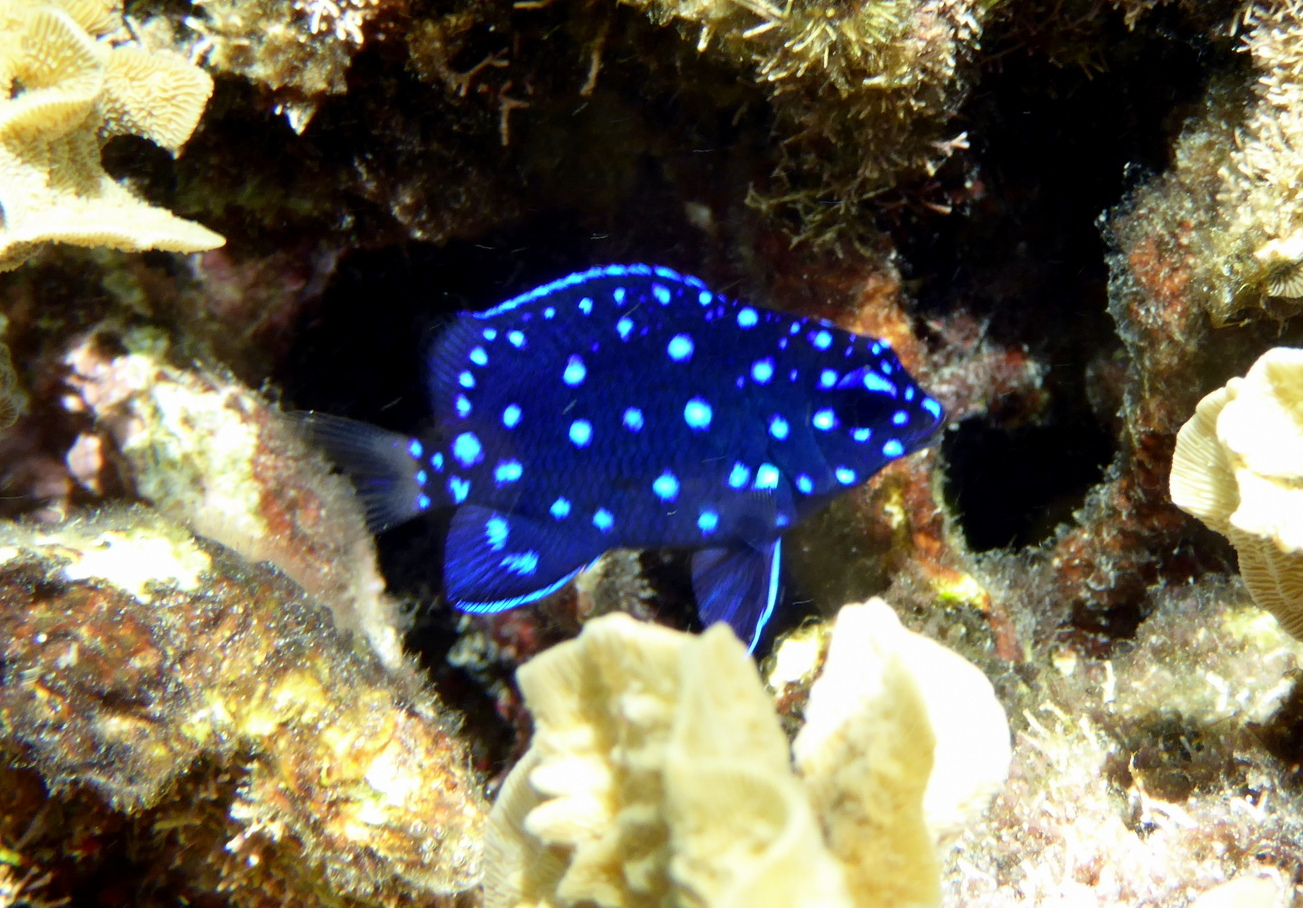
- Juvenile

Conservation status
- Least Concern (IUCN 3.1)

Scientific classification
- Kingdom: Animalia
- Phylum: Chordata
- Class: Actinopterygii
- Division: Teleostei
- Order: Blenniiformes
- Family: Pomacentridae
- Genus: Microspathodon
- Species: M. chrysurus

Binomial name
- Microspathodon chrysurus (Cuvier, 1830)

Synonyms
- Glyphidodon rudis Poey, 1860; Glyphisodon chrysurus Cuvier, 1830; Pomacentrus denegatus Poey, 1860; Pomacentrus niveatus Poey, 1876

= Microspathodon chrysurus =

Species of fish

The yellowtail damselfish (Microspathodon chrysurus) is a species of damselfish native to tropical areas such as the Caribbean coast of Panama. Damselfish are abundant in coral reef environments. The International Union for Conservation of Nature lists this fish as being of "least concern". The species is exploited on a minor scale, for fisheries and the aquarium trade. It may be threatened by the invasive lionfish.

Adult and young adult damselfish differ significantly in terms of body color. The difference was so stark that researchers believed the adult and young adult forms were two distinct species. Adults are brown with a yellow caudal fin. Young adults are violet with blue spots in their back and transparent caudal fins.

== Reproduction ==
The spawning cycle of the yellowtail damselfish starts at sunrise and lasts approximately 1 hour after male damselfish have prepared nests on dead coral surfaces. Their eggs are demersal, adhering to the substrate where males guard and aerate them. Hatching occurs the morning of the 6th day of incubation. Reproductive activity is highest during the lunar period between full and new moon. At those points in the lunar cycle, the gravitational pull of the sun and the moon are very high resulting in spring tides.

== Feeding habits ==
In regards to feeding habits, adults typically graze on algae while juveniles are carnivorous. M. chrysurus is omnivorous with a gradual change in feeding habits throughout development. This change in diet is related to the distribution of adult and young adult damselfish. Gut content analysis of yellowtail damselfish shows a change is food ingested from young adulthood to adulthood. Young adults primarily feed on animal-like nematocysts and zooxanthellae. Adults tend to tend to be more selective in their feeding habits, eating blue-green algae called cyanophytes. However, if there is an abundance of another food source available those are likely to be ingested by the species.

=== Clutch cannibalism ===
Clutch cannibalism occurs when a parent consumes its brood. Total clutch cannibalism by parental males has been observed in yellowtail damselfish directly and by analysis of gut contents. There are several working hypotheses as to why this behavior has been conserved. It is hypothesized that the decision to stop providing care could be to reallocate time and energy to attract more mates and thus increase lifetime reproductive success. Another possible reason is to increase growth rate or survival of parental damselfish in poorer condition.

The patterns of clutch loss are related to size of the brood. There is a significant tendency for smaller clutches to disappear. Most of the clutches that disappear in M. chrysurus are young, first day clutches. Researchers have not found this pattern of loss to be attributed to reproductive activity.

== Cohabitation and interspecies competition ==
There is interspecific overlap of feeding areas of M. chrysurus and two other damselfish species—Stegastes dorsopunicans and Stegastes planifrons. All three cohabitants consume the same benthic microalgae and have the same feeding cycles. In terms of defending the feeding grounds from intruders, studies have shown that M. chrysurus is less competent than Stegastes spp. at inhibiting intruders. However, yellowtail damselfish have a competitive advantage because of their size. M. chrysurus are aggressive toward their cohabitants, using their size-based dominance to obtain food.

== Gallery ==
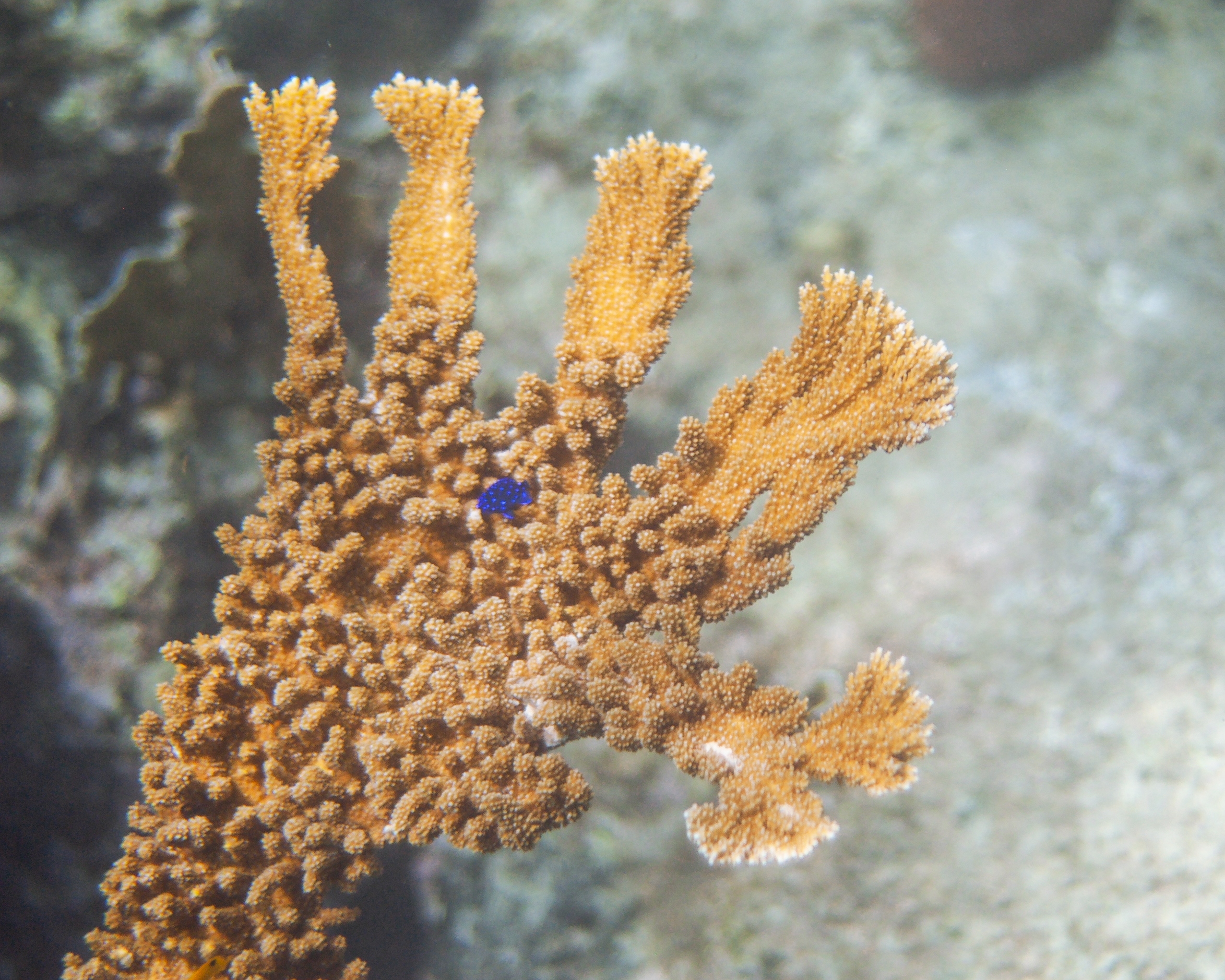
Elkhorn coral with a yellowtail damselfish in the Caribbean Sea in Curaçao

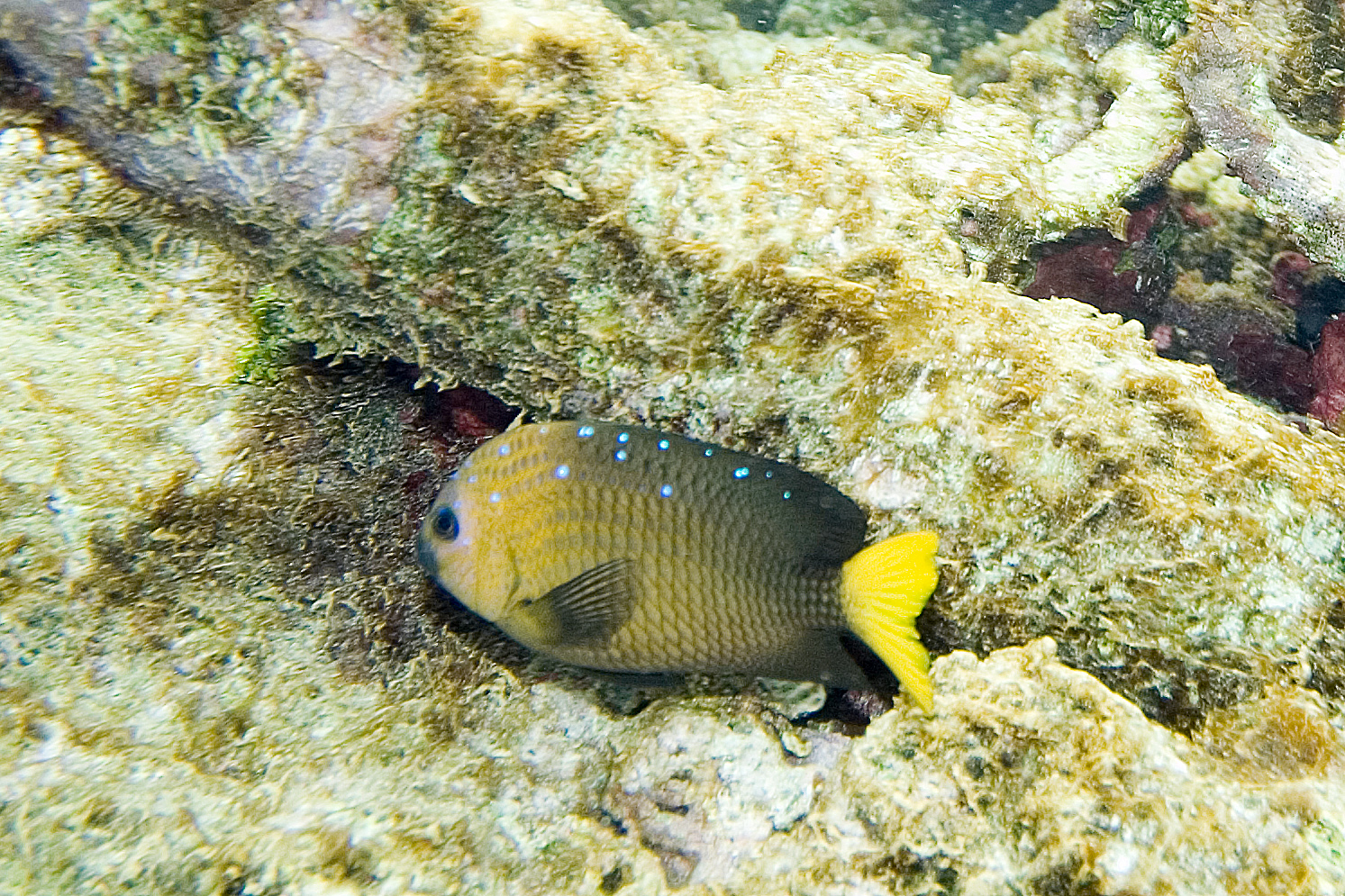

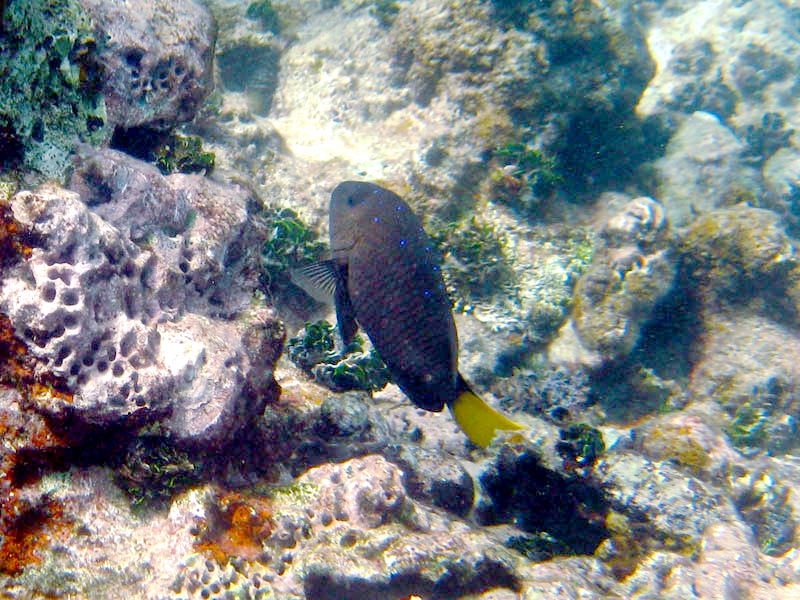

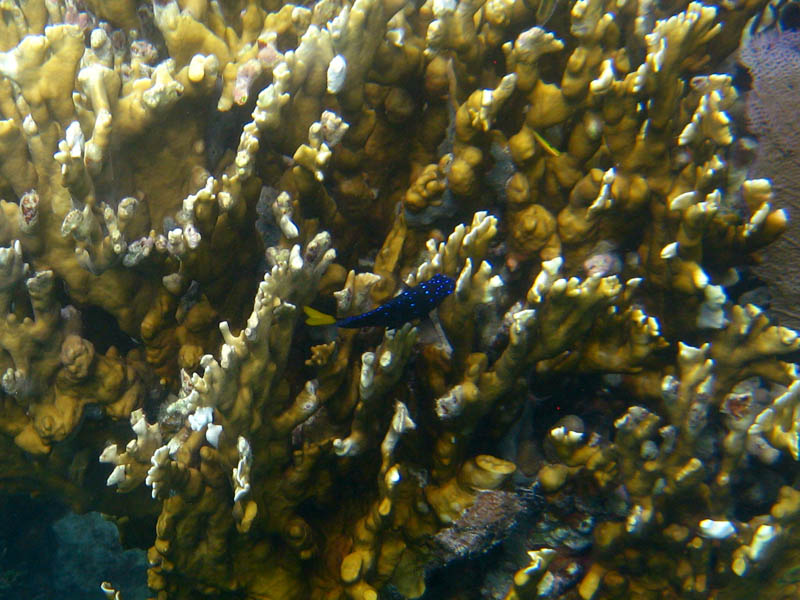

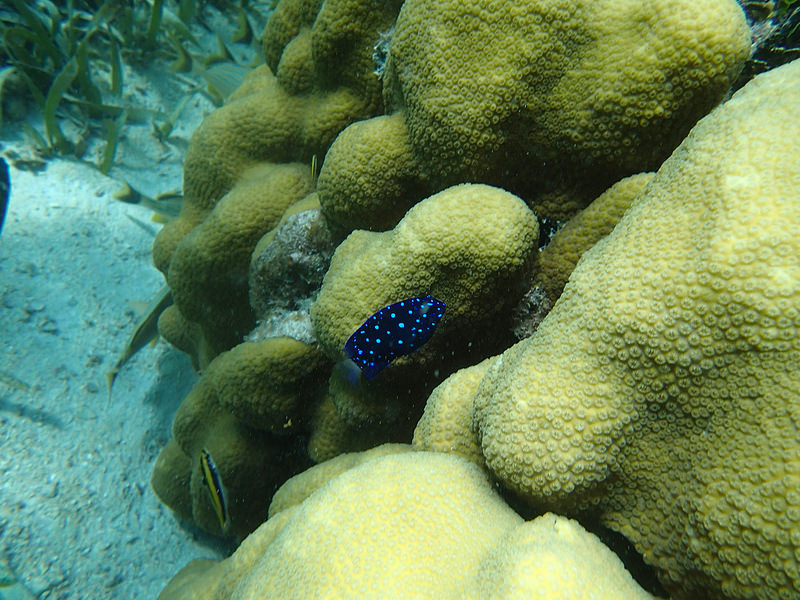
