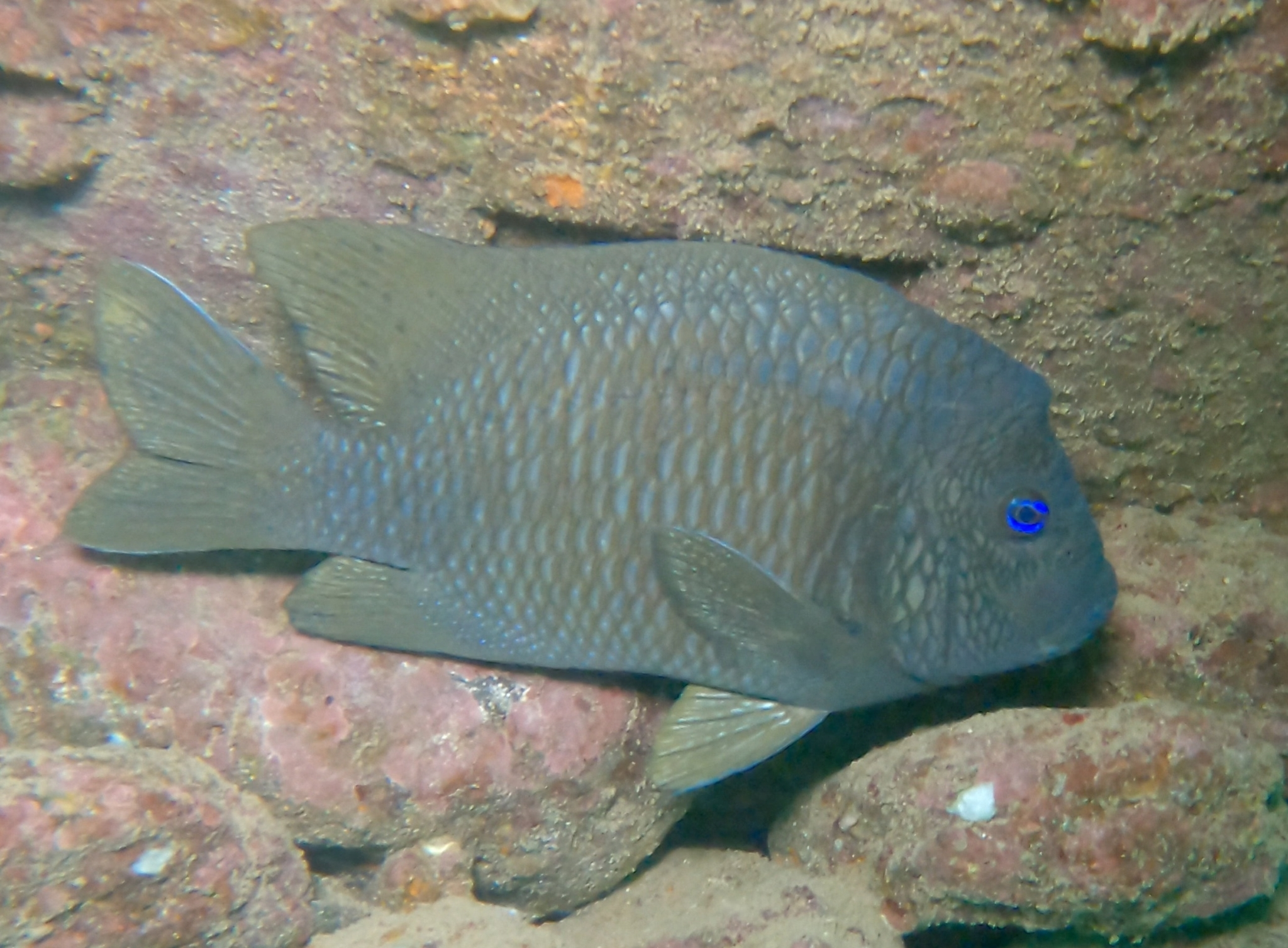
- At Socorro Island

Conservation status
- Least Concern (IUCN 3.1)

Scientific classification
- Kingdom: Animalia
- Phylum: Chordata
- Class: Actinopterygii
- Order: Blenniiformes
- Family: Pomacentridae
- Genus: Microspathodon
- Species: M. bairdii

Binomial name
- Microspathodon bairdii (T. N. Gill, 1862)

Synonyms
- Pomacentrus bairdii Gill, 1862

= Microspathodon bairdii =

Species of fish

Microspathodon bairdii, the bumphead damselfish, is a species of ray-finned fish from the family Pomacentridae. It is found in the eastern Pacific Ocean.

== Description ==
Microspathodon bairdii is a large damselfish reaching 25 centimetres (9.8 in) in standard length. The adults are dark brown or black, have purple eyes and sport a large bump on their foreheads. Juveniles are bright blue on their backs, with orange or yellow on the underside.

== Distribution ==
Microspathodon bairdii is endemic to the Eastern Pacific where its occurs from the mouth of the Gulf of California in Mexico south to Ecuador. Its range includes the Revillagigedo, Cocos, Malpelo and Galapagos Islands.

== Habitat and biology ==
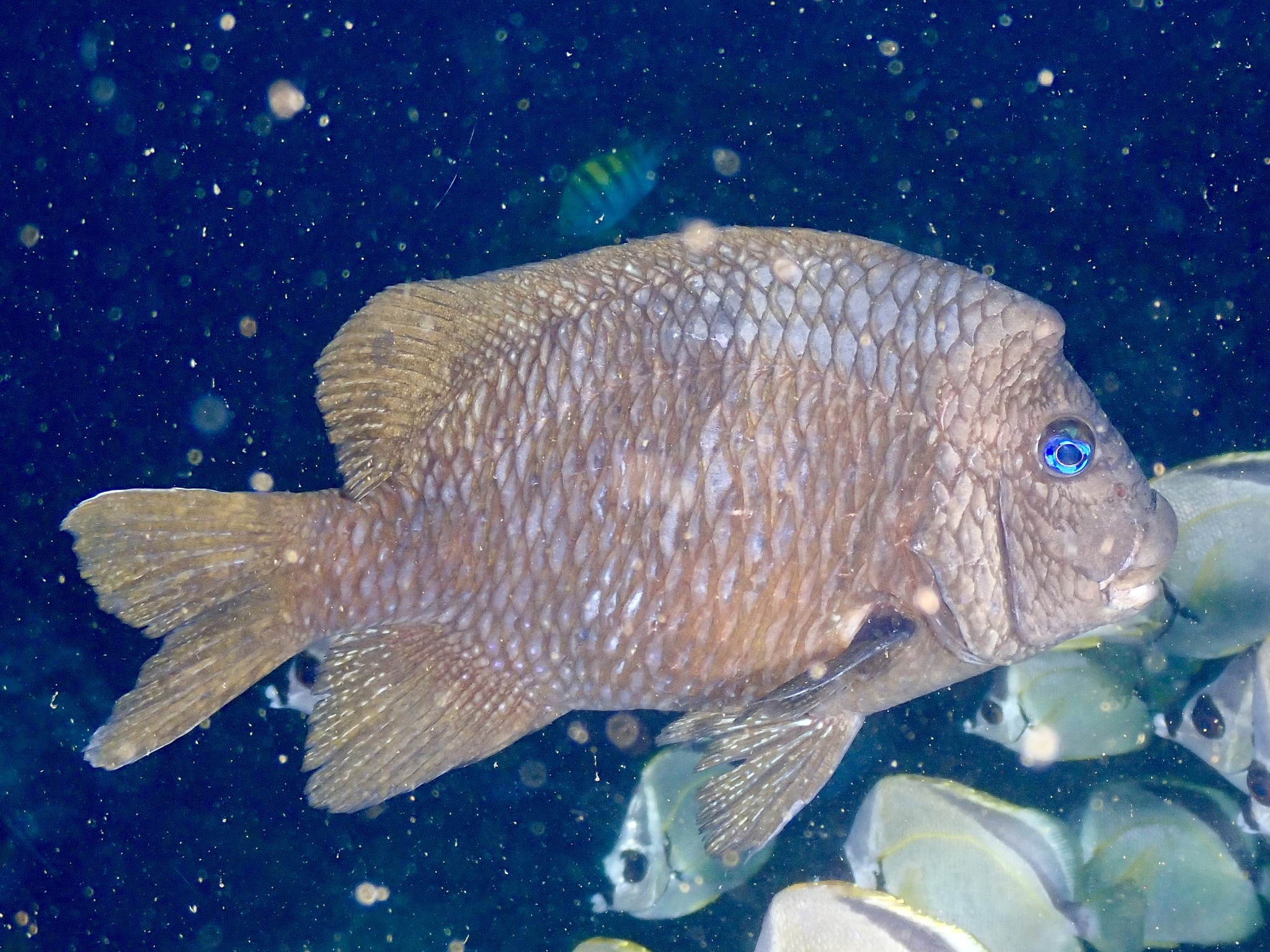
In Costa Rica

Microspathodon bairdii occurs on rocky inshore reefs exposed to wave action and currents, being found down to 15 metres (49 ft). It is most frequently recorded in the vicinity large boulders in the shallow subtidal zone. In the Gulf of Chiriquí, Panamá, the bumphead damselfish is found among huge corals and exposed shallow rocky reefs. It is mainly herbivorous, feeding on algae, but will take a hook baited with animal matter and will readily eat meat in the aquarium. They form pairs to breed and the eggs are laid in crevices in rocks where there is a strong current, on the leeward side of the current. The eggs are hoarded and aerated by the male.

== Etymology ==
The person that Gill was honouring with the specific name has not been identified but it is very probably Spencer Fullerton Baird who was director of the United States National Museum where the type specimen is located.
