= Barrall's pygmy goby =

Conservation status
- Least Concern (IUCN 3.1)

Scientific classification
- Domain: Eukaryota
- Kingdom: Animalia
- Phylum: Chordata
- Class: Actinopterygii
- Order: Gobiiformes
- Family: Gobiidae
- Genus: Trimma
- Species: T. barralli

Binomial name
- Trimma barralli R. Winterbottom, 1995

Tropical reef fish

Trimma barralli, commonly known as Barral's pygmy goby or red pygmy goby, is a species of goby native to the western Indian Ocean, particularly the Gulf of Aqaba and the Red Sea.

It inhabits deep water tropical reef settings, generally being found below 30 m (98 ft). This species grows to a length of 2.5–2.8 cm (0.98–1.10 in).
