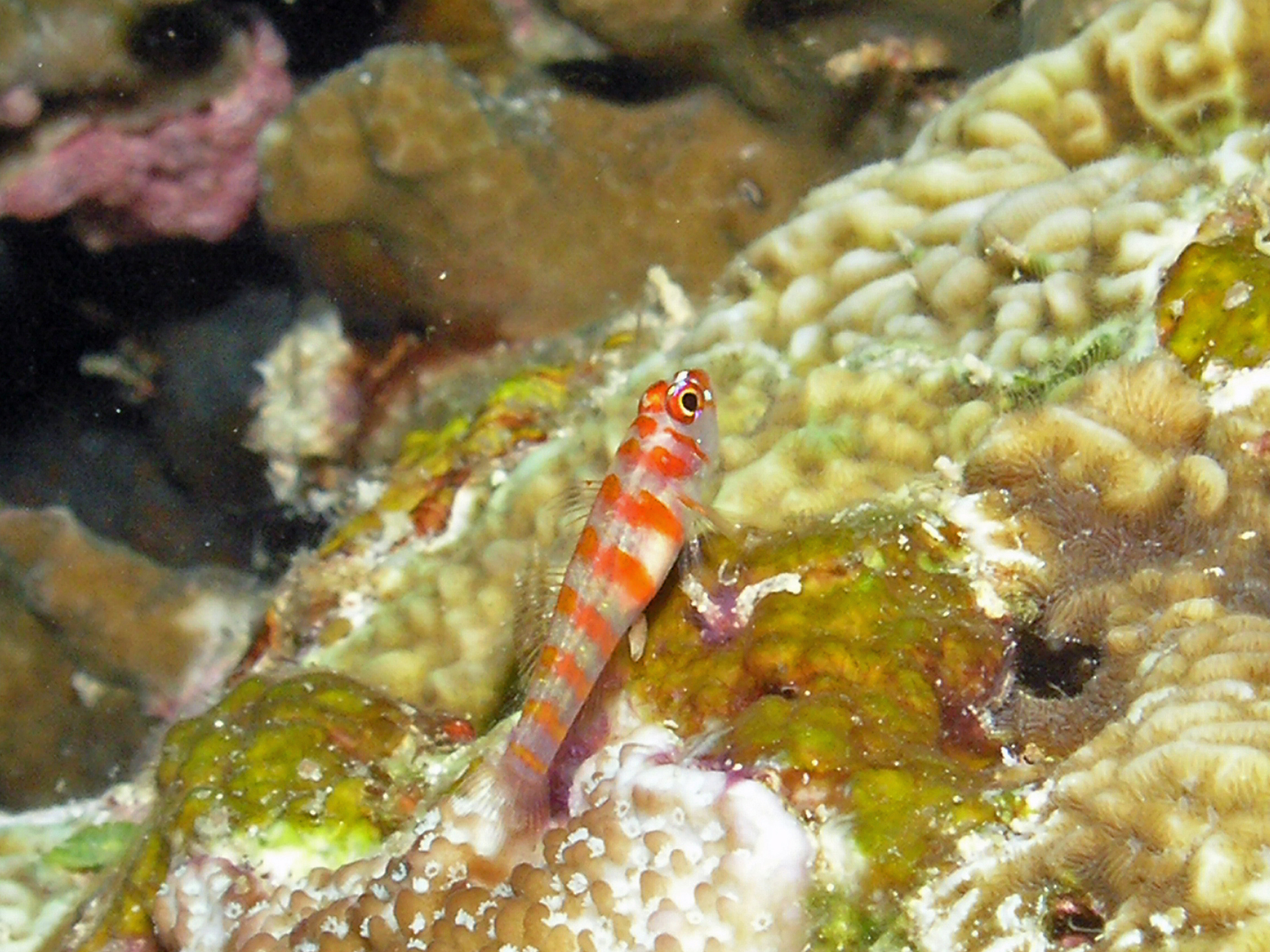

Conservation status
- Least Concern (IUCN 3.1)

Scientific classification
- Domain: Eukaryota
- Kingdom: Animalia
- Phylum: Chordata
- Class: Actinopterygii
- Order: Gobiiformes
- Family: Gobiidae
- Genus: Trimma
- Species: T. cana

Binomial name
- Trimma cana R. Winterbottom, 2004

= Candycane pygmy goby =

Species of fish

Trimma cana, the Candy cane pygmy-goby, is a species of goby native to the western Pacific Ocean where it can be found from the Philippines to Palau. It inhabits steep slopes on the outer side of reefs, preferring a hard coral substrate, at depths of from 12 to 35 metres (39 to 115 ft). This species can reach a length of 2.5 centimetres (0.98 in) SL.
