= Alan R. Emery =

Canadian marine biologist and museum professional

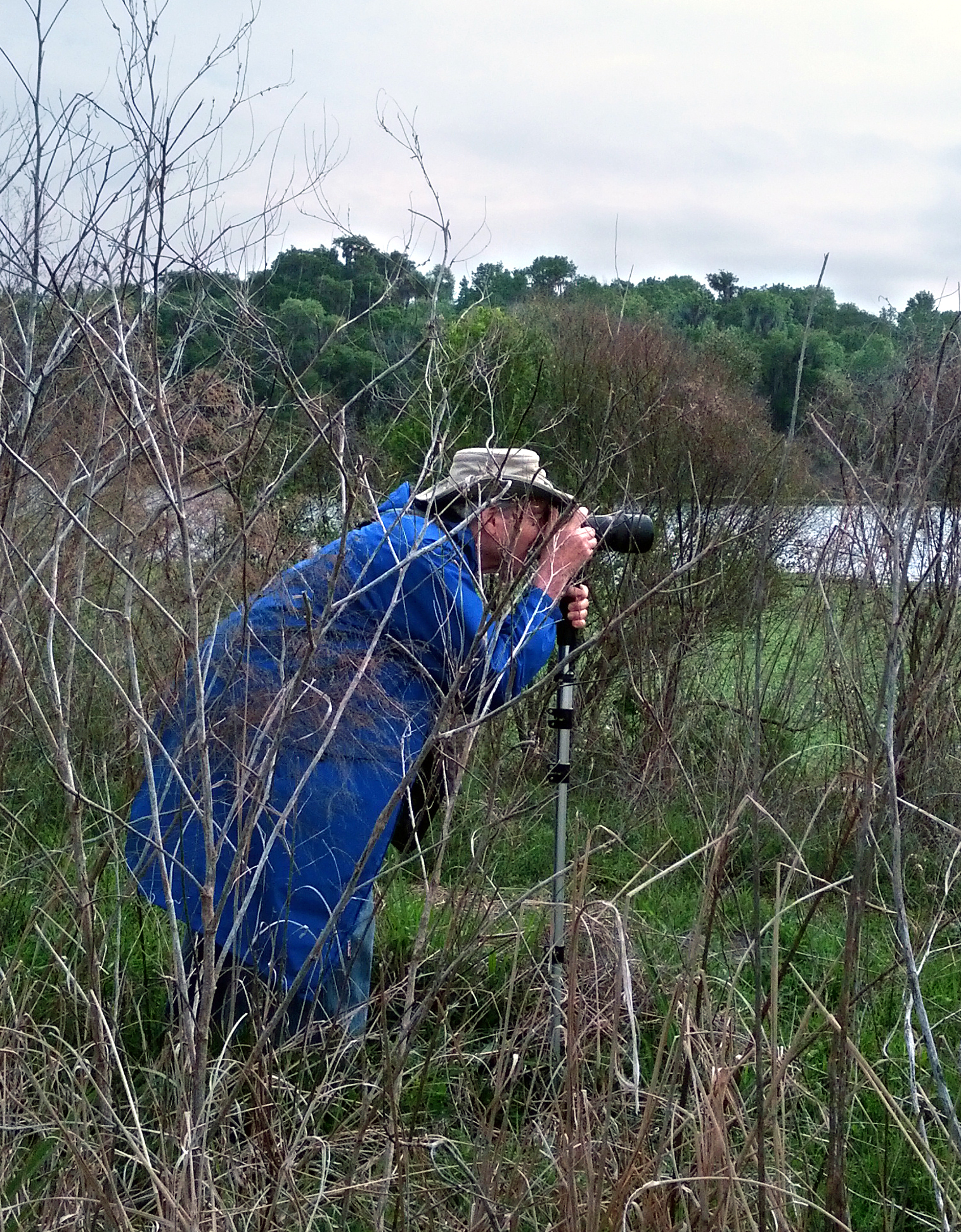
- Born: Alan Roy Emery; February 1939 (age 87); Pointe-à-Pierre, Trinidad, West Indies
- Citizenship: Canadian
- Education: University of Toronto; McGill University; University of Miami
- Occupations: marine biologist, environmental researcher, museum professional
- Spouse: Frances Emery (nee Ruttan)

Alan R. Emery (born February 1939) is a Canadian marine biologist, museum professional, environmental researcher, documentary writer, and photographer/videographer. He is currently CEO of KIVU Nature Inc. and founding member of the Stable Climate group. Alan Emery was a research scientist with the Ontario Ministry of Natural Resources (1968-1972), curator of Ichthyology and Herpetology at the Royal Ontario Museum (1969-1983), and director/president of the Canadian Museum of Nature (1983-1996, retired). Emery has researched and published in ichthyology, marine science, museum management, traditional environmental knowledge, and climate change science. He is also a nature photographer, videographer, and documentary writer. He is recognized for his work on marine and freshwater fishes, particularly coral reef and damselfish ecology, his role as director/president overseeing transitions in the history of the Canadian Museum of Nature, for creating guidelines for best practice in the collaborative integration of Traditional Environmental Knowledge into environmental science and management decisions, and for his work on environmental impacts and climate change.

== Early life and education ==
Alan R. Emery was born in 1939 in Pointe-à-Pierre, Trinidad, West Indies, of Canadian parents, Roy W. and Ruth I. (nee Jackson), the eldest of three children. Alan Emery received his Bachelor of Science at the University of Toronto and his Master of Science at McGill University in Montreal in 1964 with a study of ocean currents and their role in distributing larval marine organisms in the Caribbean. He received his Ph.D. in 1968 from the School of Marine Sciences at the University of Miami in Florida. His doctoral research included studies of the ecology and evolution of coral reefs with special emphasis on damselfish.

== Career ==
Emery's work as an ichthyologist began with his graduate years, and many of the fishes he collected as a doctoral student at the University of Miami are now curated in the Florida Museum of Natural History, Gainesville, Florida where the University of Miami ichthyological collections were transferred in the 1970s. Emery and UM colleagues named several new species, for example, the Cirrhilabrus rubrisquamis Randall & Emery, 1983.

Emery began his professional career as a research scientist with the Fisheries Research Board of Canada, St. Andrews, New Brunswick, where he was in charge of exploratory fisheries (1964-1965), and later with the Department of Lands and Forests, Ministry of Natural Resources in Ontario (1968-1974) where he documented the impact of nuclear power generating-station runoff on the environment, the impact of oil runoff on the Canadian Great Lakes, and the structure of Canadian shield lakes. While working as a senior scientist for the Sublimnos project, the first Canadian underwater habitat placed for open science research in the waters of Tobermory, Georgian Bay, he was the first to report the "thermal pollution" impacts of a 100 ft high natural seiche intrusion. Emery was also one of the first to reveal under-ice overwintering by frogs in Ontario.

=== Curator, Royal Ontario Museum ===
From 1969-1974, he was a research associate with the Royal Ontario Museum (ROM), and in 1974, he became assistant curator of Ichthyology there and adjunct assistant professor at the University of Toronto until 1983. As curator, he conducted field and laboratory work on fish taxonomy, evolution, and ecology, describing the impact of various environmental and population factors on species richness in arctic, boreal, and tropical lakes and marine environments. His early work on fish communication and the effect of depth on underwater photography was innovative, as was his development of a method for setting and photographing fish specimens in the field.

Emery's 1979 expedition to the Chagos Archipelago, particularly the island of Diego Garcia as part of the Joint Services Chagos Research Expedition, resulted in the collection of about 40 new fish taxa and is cited as "the most comprehensive collection of fishes at Chagos..." in addition to the discovery of Trimmatom nanus, at the time "the smallest vertebrate yet to be described." His 1983 expedition, co-directed with fellow Royal Ontario Museum ichthyologist and curator Richard Winterbottom, documented the origins of the Fiji fish fauna and studied the fisheries potential and tourism impacts on the Dravuni communities. This expedition was a cooperative effort between the Institute of Marine Resources of the University of the South Pacific in Suva, Fiji, the Royal Ontario Museum of Canada, and the Canadian Armed Forces.

=== Director and president, Canadian Museum of Nature ===
In 1983, he left the Royal Ontario Museum to take the position of director (later, president) of the Canadian Museum of Nature (then Canadian Museum of Natural Sciences) in Ottawa, Ontario, where he remained until his retirement from the institution in 1996.

In 1989, Emery worked closely with government, the public, and leaders in Canadian mining to raise $5 million to purchase for Canada "one of the greatest collections of minerals in the world" from William Pinch, a Rochester resident and avocational collector. The largest donation toward the cause was 1.25 million from Viola MacMillan after whom Emery named the CMN gallery "The Viola MacMillan National Mineral Exhibition Gallery."

In 1990, Emery enabled the designation of the Victoria Memorial Museum Building as a National Historic Site of Canada, and was instrumental in the renaming of the Canadian Museum of Natural Sciences to the Canadian Museum of Nature (CMN) and its establishment by the Museums Act as "a Crown corporation named in Part I of Schedule III to the Financial Administration Act" shifting the institution from its prior position as a government entity under the jurisdiction of the National Museums of Canada.

Also in 1990, Emery hosted Raisa Gorbachev, the wife of Russian President Mikhail Gorbachev, along with Canadian First Lady Mila Mulroney at the CMN, a visit described in Prime Minister Mulroney's memoirs.

Emery's design for an aquarium installation on LeBreton Flats that would combine water features, nature areas, and retail space, based on work starting in 1986 with the architectural firm Cambridge Seven Associates, won a competitive National Capital Commission bid for the construction in 1990, but the development was not implemented due to deep cuts to the National Capital Commission budgets in the same year as the successful bid and complications caused by soil and water contamination from a long history of industrial uses.

On October 29, 1991, Emery hosted Princess Diana to open the CMN Whales exhibit at the World Exchange Plaza during her last royal tour to Canada. The spelling of "Diana of Whales" caught the eye of several news media outlets.

Between 1993 and 1997, Emery implemented a program of major renovations of the Victoria Building including cleaning and repairing the heritage stonework exterior "...to stabilize and restore the VMMB's exterior envelope as the first phase of the VMMB's long-term rehabilitation program." Also beginning in 1993, Emery oversaw the development of a new state-of-the-art consolidated research and collections curation facility to replace those scattered among 11 buildings located around the National Capital Region named the Natural Heritage Campus. The new research facility opened in spring 1997, shortly after Emery's retirement, and was lauded as one of the principal museum facilities of the country.

=== CEO, KIVU Nature Inc. ===
In 1997, following his retirement from the Canadian Museum of Nature, Emery established KIVU Nature Inc., standing for Knowledge, Imagery, Vision, and Understanding, facilitating workshops and publishing on the integration of traditional knowledge into the environmental assessments, teaching at the Banff Centre emphasizing the use of traditional knowledge in environmental assessments, and consulting and publishing on museum management.

Most recently, Emery and colleagues established the Stable Climate collaboration with the mission to build a healthy, stable climate, established through sensible economic and ecological principles using a wide array of energy sources, land use practices, and personal efforts. Their vision is a world with a carefully managed, benign and stable climate with optimum conditions for human well-being and long-term sustainable use of resources and energy. As part of that work, Emery has published and presented at various venues on topics related to global climate change. Emery is a Sigma Xi member, emeritus of the University of Toronto chapter, and a regular writer in the Sigma Xi "Lab Conversations." In 2015, he was invited to provide a guest post in the "Keyed-In" blog, reporting on the resistance of Canadian scientists to political efforts to reduce funding and support for science.

=== Science communication in media and entertainment ===
Throughout his career, Emery has been active in communicating science to the public including publications in the Royal Ontario Museum public-interest series "Rotunda", and in 1981 an illustrated book about coral reefs based on the CBC-TV series The Nature of Things (on which Emery was also scientific consultant for several episodes), which included many of his original photographs. He was the scientific advisor for many underwater documentaries including on The Last Frontier, a 100 program TV series produced and directed by John Stoneman and Mako Films that aired on CTV from 1987 to 1990. Several of these programs featured Emery's research, notably the October 1987 show on the impact of sound on aquatic life forms, the February 1990 show about color perception underwater, and the May 1990 show about plankton's role in the coral reef. Emery is the author of 31 Vimeo videos (for example, "Traditional Knowledge on the Mackenzie River 2012") and one channel (Stable Climate Group).

Less science-oriented but still focused on the denizens of the marine world, Emery was also technical consultant for the undersea-life sections of the movie The Neptune Factor (1973, Canadian studio Kino Lorber, directed by Daniel Petrie and starring Ernest Borgnine among others). In 2011, Emery published a science fiction novel, "Symbiont," based still on biology, albeit an alien one.

== Honours, decorations, awards and distinctions ==
President:

- Royal Canadian Institute for Science, 1983-1984 (Canada's oldest scientific society)
- Association of Systematics Collections, 1987-1989
- Canadian Committee of the International Union for the Conservation of Nature, 1990, 1995-1998

Board of Governors:

- American Society Ichthyologists and Herpetologists, 1976-1986
- CMN Centre for Traditional Knowledge, 1993-2000

Scientific Editor:

- Copeia: Journal of the American Association of Ichthyologists and Herpetologists
- Royal Ontario Museum Series

Governor or member:

- American Fisheries Society, American Association of Science Museum Directors
- Society for the Preservation of Systematics Collections

Recipient:

- Citation - Sports Fishing Institute, Washington
- Marine Environmental Award - Foundation for Ocean Research, Toronto, 1986
- Reconocimiento de Honor - Fundación Cultural Banesto, Spain, 1992
- The fish Trimma emeryi Winterbottom 1985, was named "...in honor of Alan Roy Emery (b. 1939), Curator, Ichthyology and Herpetology, Royal Ontario Museum, friend, colleague, and diving buddy, in memory of our expeditions to the Indo-Pacific."
- The fish Stegastes emeryi Allen and Randall 1974 named in honor of Alan Roy Emery
