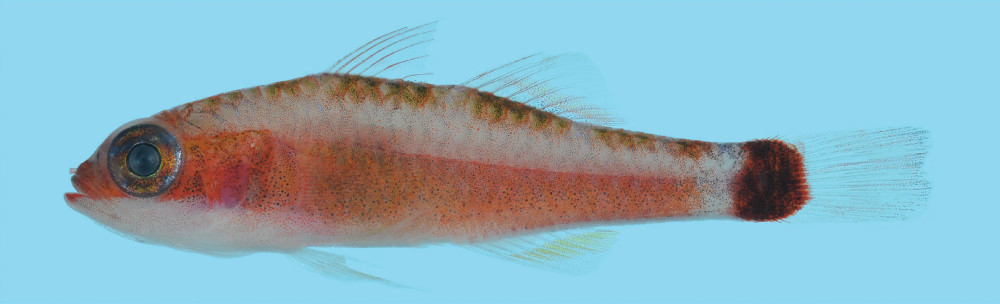
- Male from Rabaul, New Britain, 16 mm (0.63 in)

Conservation status
- Least Concern (IUCN 3.1)

Scientific classification
- Kingdom: Animalia
- Phylum: Chordata
- Class: Actinopterygii
- Division: Teleostei
- Order: Gobiiformes
- Family: Gobiidae
- Genus: Trimma
- Species: T. tevegae

Binomial name
- Trimma tevegae Cohen & Davis, 1969

= Trimma tevegae =

Species of fish

Trimma tevegae, commonly known as the bluestripe pygmygoby or blue-striped cave goby among other names, is a species of goby from the western Pacific. They are small fish, averaging at 2 cm (0.79 in), orange-brown with white undersides in life, with characteristic iridescent blue or lavender stripes on the sides and on top of the body. They are usually found in large schools in the sloping or vertical drop-offs at coral reef edges. They are sometimes caught for the aquarium trade, and are also known by hobbyists under the name blue line flagtail goby. The species is named in honor of the schooner Te Vega.

== Taxonomy ==
T. tevegae belongs to the Trimma tevegae species group of the dwarfgoby genus Trimma. It was included in the true goby subfamily Gobiinae in the goby family Gobiidae. However, the 5th Edition of Fishes of the World does not give any subfamilies in the Gobiidae. It was first described by the ichthyologists Daniel M. Cohen and William P. Davis in 1969 from specimens collected in Rabaul, New Britain. The generic name Trimma is derived from Greek τρίμματος (trimmatos, "something crushed"). The specific name is in honor of the schooner Te Vega, which was used as the research vessel (then under the Stanford University's Hopkins Marine Station) by the authors during the collection trip.

In 2005, the ichthyologist Richard Winterbottom examined specimens of Trimma caudomaculatum, described in 1975 by the Japanese ichthyologists Tetsuo Yoshino and Chūichi Araga, and compared them with specimens of T. tevegae. Based on morphology, he concluded that they belonged to the same species, and thus synonymized T. caudomaculatum with T. tevegae. However, he reversed this opinion after a 2011 phylogenetic study on the genus Trimma. T. caudomaculatum is now again considered to be a separate valid species, though still closely related to T. tevegae. The study also revealed that T. tevegae may be a cryptic species complex.

T. tevegae is known under a number of common names in English, mostly based on the characteristic blue stripe running through the body. These include various permutations of the names "bluestripe pygmgygoby", "blue-striped cave goby", or "blue-striped dwarfgoby". It is also known under various non-specific common names in other languages, like mano'o-moi in Samoan and kultit or paku in Calamian Tagbanwa in the Philippines.

== Description ==
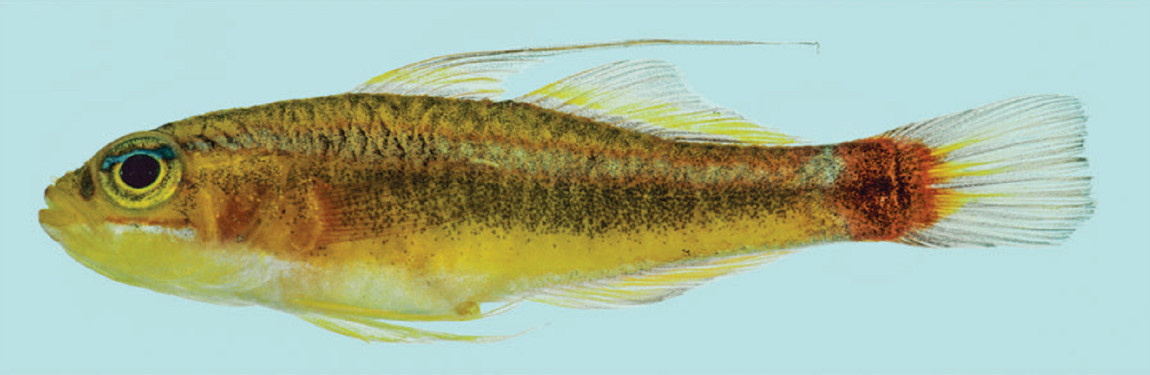
Male with elongated second dorsal spine preserved, from Koror, Palau, 22.5 mm (0.89 in)

Bluestripe pygmygobies are tiny fish, usually averaging at 2 cm (0.79 in). The maximum recorded length is 4.5 cm (1.77 in). The dorsal fin has seven spines and eight to nine soft rays. The second dorsal spine in males is elongated and filamentous. The anal fin has one spine, and eight to nine soft rays.

They are predominantly orange-brown in color with a white underside. The source of their common name is a lavender to blueish stripe running through the middle of the upper body; from the upper lip, across the upper part of the eye, and towards the tail. A narrower stripe of the same color also runs along the base of the dorsal fin. On the base of the tail is a large dark reddish-brown blotch. They seem drab in preserved specimens, but in living specimens they display brilliant blue, green, and vivid pink iridescence when light shines upon their bodies.

== Distribution ==
T. tevegae can be found in the Western Pacific coral reefs usually at depths of 10 to 40 m (33 to 131 ft), with a maximum recorded depth being 72 m (236 ft). They have been recorded in the Ryukyu and Izu Islands of Japan to New Britain, Papua New Guinea; and from the Rowley Shoals of Australia to Tonga.

== Ecology ==
Bluestripe pygmygobies generally congregate in large, loose schools near coral reef drop-offs pockmarked by caves or recesses. They may school together with related species like the nasal dwarfgobies (Trimma nasa) or wasp pygmygobies (Trimma flavatrum). They usually orient themselves vertically with their heads facing upwards along the coral reef wall and feed on zooplankton traveling down the water column. When threatened they will quickly retreat inside hiding places.

T. tevegae has one of the longest lifespans among the characteristically very short-lived dwarfgobies. The longest on record was an individual in captivity in the Waikiki Aquarium in Hawaii which lived for 20 months.

== Importance ==
Bluestripe pygmygobies are not fished for food by humans, but they are sometimes caught for the aquarium trade. Though rarely available, they are comparatively the most common dwarfgoby species kept in reef aquaria, particularly in the smaller nano reef tank setups. This is due their hardiness, the ease of their care, their size, and their shoaling behavior. In addition to usual common names, they are sometimes referred to as the "blue line flagtail goby" by hobbyists.

== See also ==
- Eviota
