= Pandaka lidwilli =

Scientific classification
- Domain: Eukaryota
- Kingdom: Animalia
- Phylum: Chordata
- Class: Actinopterygii
- Order: Gobiiformes
- Family: Oxudercidae
- Genus: Pandaka
- Species: P. lidwilli

Binomial name
- Pandaka lidwilli (McCulloch, 1917)

Synonyms
- Gobius lidwilli McCulloch, 1917

Species of fish

Pandaka lidwilli, or the Lidwill's dwarf goby, is a species of goby found in brackish and salt water in the mouths of rivers and maritime zones in Japan, Australia, and Papua New Guinea. In the Teima River estuary on Okinawa-jima Island, Japan, Pandaka lidwilli spawns from January to October. It lives in muddy substrate near mangroves and is threatened by human activities such as landfill and deforestation, so it’s listed “Vulnerable” in Japan’s Red Data Books. The specific name honours the Australian anesthesiologist and cardiologist Mark C. Lidwill (1878–1969), who was co-inventor of the pacemaker, as well as being a saltwater angler who, while fishing for game fish, observed this tiny goby and brought it to the attention of Allan Riverstone McCulloch who subsequently described it.
