= Trimmatom nanus =

Conservation status
- Least Concern (IUCN 3.1)

Scientific classification
- Kingdom: Animalia
- Phylum: Chordata
- Class: Actinopterygii
- Division: Teleostei
- Order: Gobiiformes
- Family: Gobiidae
- Genus: Trimmatom
- Species: T. nanus

Binomial name
- Trimmatom nanus R. Winterbottom & Emery, 1981

Species of fish

Trimmatom nanus, the midget dwarfgoby, is a species of marine goby native to the Indian Ocean and the western Pacific Ocean. It can mainly be found on oceanic drop-offs at depths of from 20 to 30 metres (66 to 98 ft) though it can occasionally be found in outer reef areas and lagoons at depths of from 5 to 35 metres (16 to 115 ft). This species can reach a length of 1 centimetre (0.39 in) SL.

T. nanus was until 2004 the smallest known fish and vertebrate. The recent discovery of Schindleria brevipinguis (called the stout infantfish) relegated it to second place. Later, the discovery of Paedocypris progenetica dropped T. nanus to third place. The record for the smallest known vertebrate being held by the frog Paedophryne amauensis, formally described in January 2012.
