= Trimmatom =

Scientific classification
- Kingdom: Animalia
- Phylum: Chordata
- Class: Actinopterygii
- Order: Gobiiformes
- Family: Gobiidae
- Genus: Trimmatom; R. Winterbottom & Emery, 1981

Type species
- Trimmatom nanus R. Winterbottom & Emery, 1981

Genus of fishes

Trimmatom is a genus of gobies native to the Indian Ocean and the western Pacific Ocean.

== Species ==
There are currently seven recognized species in this genus:

- Trimmatom eviotops (L. P. Schultz, 1943) (Red-barred rubble goby)
- Trimmatom macropodus R. Winterbottom, 1989 (Bigfoot dwarfgoby)
- Trimmatom nanus R. Winterbottom & Emery, 1981 (Midget dwarfgoby)
- Trimmatom offucius R. Winterbottom & Emery, 1981
- Trimmatom pharus R. Winterbottom, 2001 (Lifehouse dwarfgoby)
- Trimmatom sagma R. Winterbottom, 1989 (Saddled dwarfgoby)
- Trimmatom zapotes R. Winterbottom, 1989
