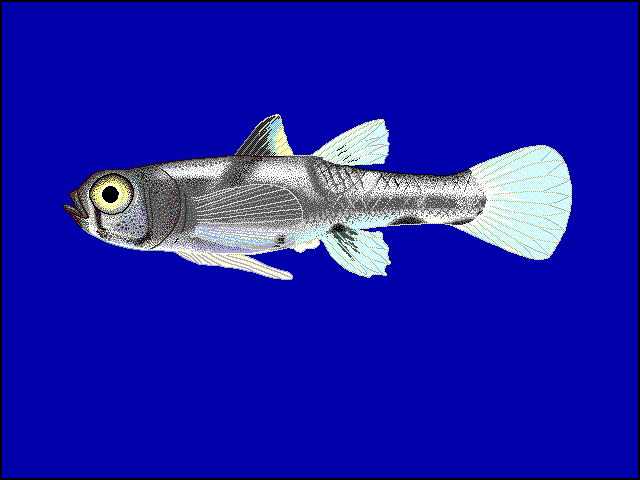
- Pandaka pygmaea

Scientific classification
- Kingdom: Animalia
- Phylum: Chordata
- Class: Actinopterygii
- Order: Gobiiformes
- Family: Oxudercidae
- Subfamily: Gobionellinae
- Genus: Pandaka; Herre, 1927

Type species
- Pandaka pusilla Herre, 1927

Synonyms
- Berowra Whitley, 1928

= Pandaka (fish) =

Genus of fishes

Pandaka is a genus of fish in the goby subfamily, Gobionellinae, native to fresh, brackish and marine waters of Asia and the western Pacific Ocean. Some species in the genus are among the smallest fish in the world; the male P. pygmaea can be just 9 mm (0.35 in) in standard length at maturity.

The genus name is a word for a dwarf in the a number of languages of the Philippines and refers to the small size of these fish.

== Species ==
There are currently seven recognized species in this genus:

- Pandaka bipunctata H. L. Wu, 2008
- Pandaka lidwilli (McCulloch, 1917) (dwarf tiger goby)
- Pandaka pusilla Herre, 1927 (tiny pygmy-goby)
- Pandaka pygmaea Herre, 1927 (dwarf pygmy goby)
- Pandaka rouxi (M. C. W. Weber, 1911) (Roux's pygmy-goby)
- Pandaka silvana (Barnard, 1943) (dwarfgoby)
- Pandaka trimaculata Akihito & Meguro, 1975
