= William Pinch =

American mineralogist

William Wallace Pinch (August 15, 1940 – April 1, 2017) was a mineralogist from Rochester, New York. The Mineralogical Association of Canada has an award named after him, the Pinch Medal, "to recognize major and sustained contributions to the advancement of mineralogy by members of the collector-dealer community." The Pinch Medal has been awarded to a deserving mineralogist every other year since it was first awarded to Pinch in 2001, and is given at the Tucson Mineral Show in February.

Pinch was also a notable mineral collector. His collection was sold in 1989 to the Canadian Museum of Nature for $US 3.5 million, and will be documented in a book to be published in 2018.

The oxyhalide mineral pinchite was named in his honour.

In June 1993, when the film Jurassic Park premiered at Loew's Theater in Pittsford, New York, Mr. Pinch loaned many fossils of dinosaurs and plants, as well as the display cases for the lobby to help educate the public.
