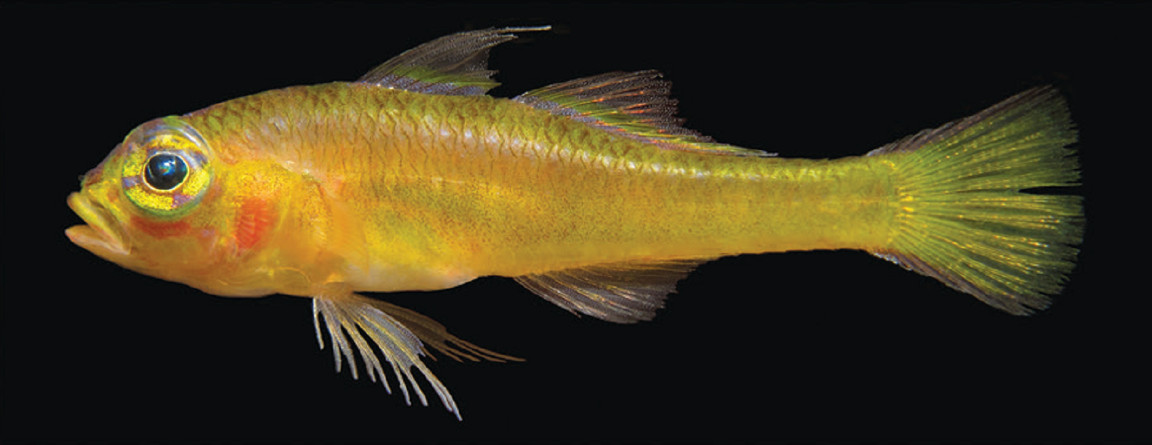
- Trimma gigantum
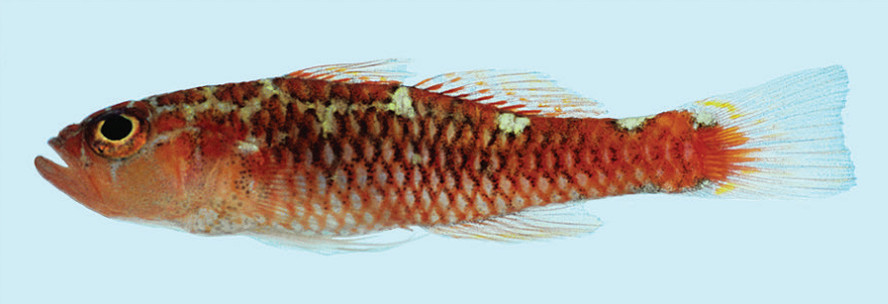
- Trimma caesiura

Scientific classification
- Kingdom: Animalia
- Phylum: Chordata
- Class: Actinopterygii
- Division: Teleostei
- Order: Gobiiformes
- Family: Gobiidae
- Genus: Trimma; D. S. Jordan & Seale, 1906

Type species
- Trimma caesiura D. S. Jordan & Seale, 1906

= Trimma =

Genus of fishes

Trimma is a genus of fish in the family Gobiidae native to the Indian and Pacific Ocean. Together with members of the genus Eviota, they are known commonly as pygmygobies or dwarfgobies.

== Species ==
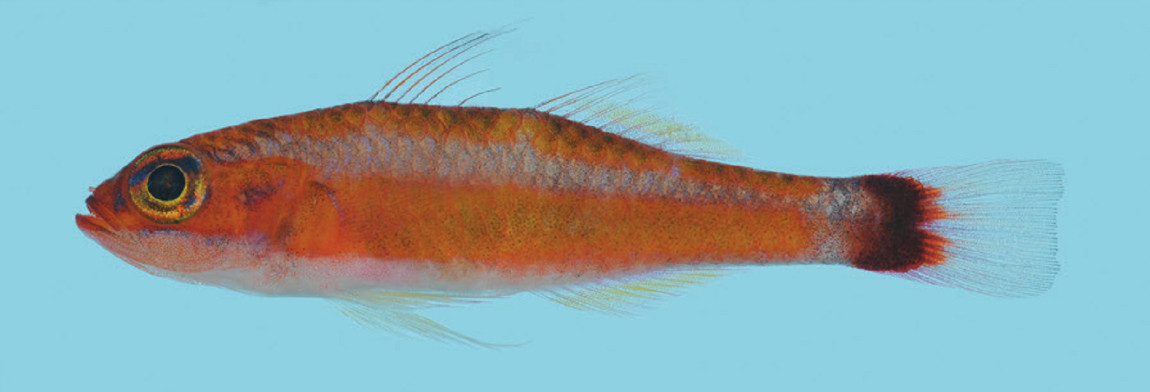
Trimma caudomaculatum

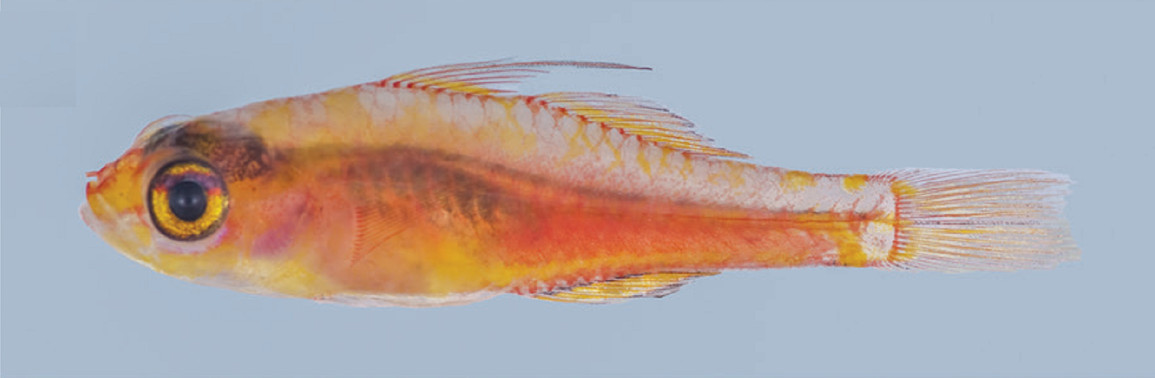
Trimma habrum

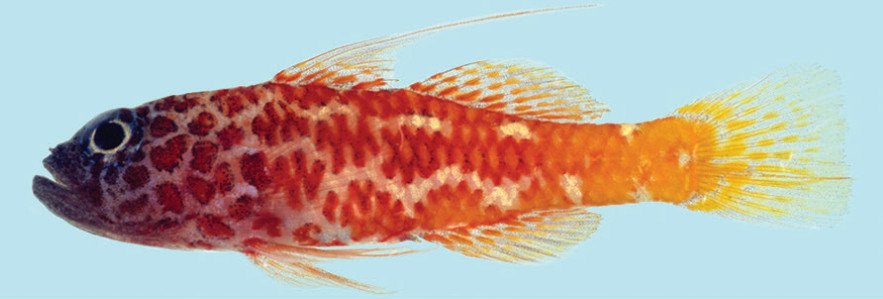
Trimma lantana

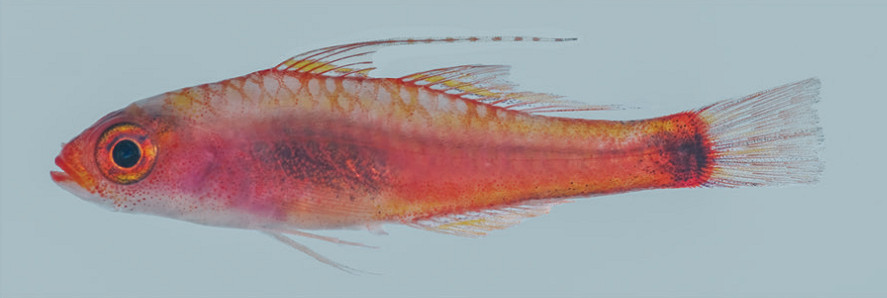
Trimma nasa

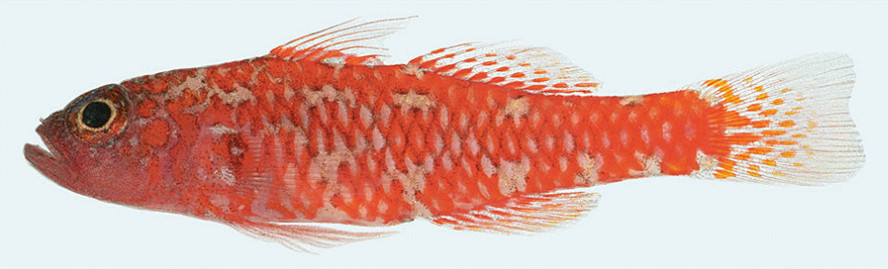
Trimma naudei female 23.3 mm, Nha Trang, Vietnam

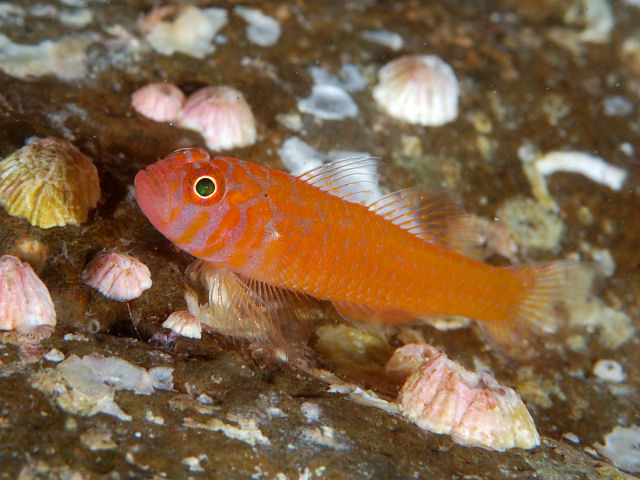
Trimma okinawae

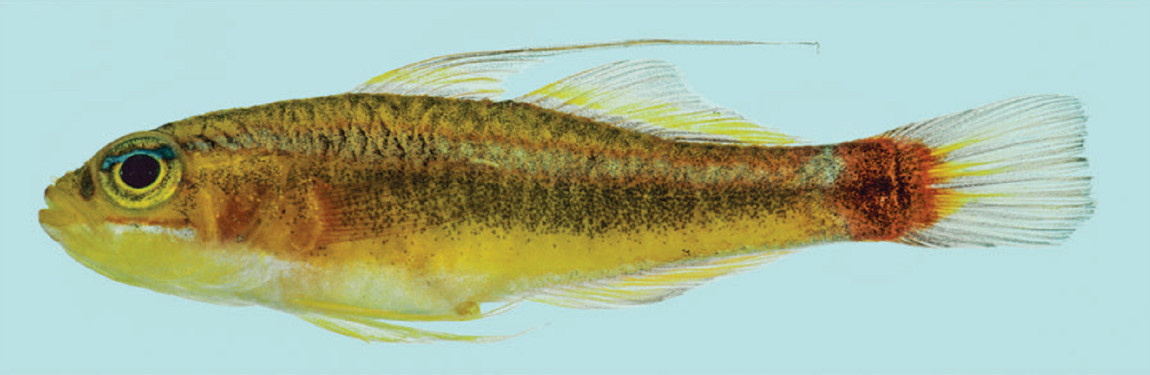
Trimma tevegae

There are currently 111 recognized species in this genus:

- Trimma abyssum G. R. Allen, 2015 (Deep-reef pygmygoby)
- Trimma agrena R. Winterbottom & I. S. Chen, 2004 (Fishnet pygmygoby)
- Trimma anaima R. Winterbottom, 2000 (Sharp-eye pygmygoby)
- Trimma annosum R. Winterbottom, 2003 (Grey-bearded pygmygoby)
- Trimma anthrenum R. Winterbottom, 2006 (Honey-bee pygmygoby)
- Trimma aturirii R. Winterbottom, Erdmann & Cahyani, 2015 (Aturiri's pygmygoby)
- Trimma avidori (Goren, 1978) (Avidor's pygmygoby)
- Trimma barralli R. Winterbottom, 1995 (Barrall's pygmygoby)
- Trimma bathum R. Winterbottom, 2017 (Deep-reef pygmygoby)
- Trimma benjamini R. Winterbottom, 1996 (Ring-eye pygmygoby)
- Trimma bisella R. Winterbottom, 2000 (Two-saddle pygmygoby)
- Trimma blematium R. Winterbottom & Erdmann, 2018 (Blue-eyed pygmygoby)
- Trimma burridgeae R. Winterbottom, 2016 (Mary's pygmygoby)
- Trimma caesiura D. S. Jordan & Seale, 1906 (Caesiura pygmygoby)
- Trimma cana R. Winterbottom, 2004 (Candycane pygmygoby)
- Trimma capostriatum (Goren, 1981) (Spotted red-lined pygmygoby)
- Trimma caudipunctatum T. Suzuki & Senou, 2009 (Spot-tailed pygmygoby)
- Trimma caudomaculatum Yoshino & Araga, 1975 (Blotch-tailed pygmygoby)
- Trimma cavicapum R. Winterbottom, Eleanor Brighton & Christophe Mason-Parker, 2024
- Trimma cheni R. Winterbottom, 2011 (Face-stripe pygmygoby)
- Trimma chledophilum G. R. Allen, 2015 (Mud pygmygoby)
- Trimma citrum R. Winterbottom & Pyle, 2022 (Lemon pygmygoby)
- Trimma corallinum (J. L. B. Smith, 1959) (Polka-dot pygmygoby)
- Trimma corerefum R. Winterbottom, 2016 (Colin's pygmygoby)
- Trimma dalerocheila R. Winterbottom, 1984 (Hotlips pygmygoby)
- Trimma emeryi R. Winterbottom, 1985 (Emery's pygmygoby)
- Trimma erdmanni R. Winterbottom, 2011 (Erdmann's pygmygoby)
- Trimma erwani Viviani, J. T. Williams & Planes, 2016 (Slanted pygmygoby)
- Trimma fangi R. Winterbottom & I. S. Chen, 2004 (Fang's pygmygoby)
- Trimma fasciatum T. Suzuki, Sakaue & Senou, 2012 (Yellow-banded pygmygoby)
- Trimma filamentosum R. Winterbottom, 1995 (Long-spine pygmygoby)
- Trimma finistrinum R. Winterbottom, 2017 (Porthole pygmygoby)
- Trimma fishelsoni Goren, 1985 (Fishelson's pygmygoby)
- Trimma flammeum (J. L. B. Smith, 1959) (Flame pygmygoby)
- Trimma flavatrum K. Hagiwara & R. Winterbottom, 2007 (Wasp pygmygoby)
- Trimma flavicaudatum (Goren, 1982) (Yellow-tailed pygmygoby)
- Trimma fraena R. Winterbottom, 1984 (Bridle pygmygoby)
- Trimma fucatum R. Winterbottom & Southcott, 2007 (Harlot pygmygoby)
- Trimma gigantum R. Winterbottom & Zur, 2007 (Giant pygmygoby)
- Trimma grammistes (Tomiyama, 1936) (Black-striped pygmygoby)
- Trimma griffithsi R. Winterbottom, 1984 (Griffiths' pygmygoby)
- Trimma habrum R. Winterbottom, 2011 (Delicate pygmygoby)
- Trimma haima R. Winterbottom, 1984 (Cut-face pygmygoby)
- Trimma haimassum R. Winterbottom, 2011 (Blood-spot pygmygoby)
- Trimma halonevum R. Winterbottom, 2000 (Pimple pygmygoby)
- Trimma hamartium R. Winterbottom, 2018 (Mistaken pygmygoby)
- Trimma hayashii K. Hagiwara & R. Winterbottom, 2007 (Four-eye pygmygoby)
- Trimma helenae R. Winterbottom, Erdmann & Cahyani, 2014 (Helen's pygmygoby)
- Trimma hoesei R. Winterbottom, 1984 (Fork-tail pygmygoby)
- Trimma hollemani R. Winterbottom, 2016 (Holleman’s pygmygoby)
- Trimma hotsarihiensis R. Winterbottom, 2009 (Helen Reef pygmygoby)
- Trimma imaii T. Suzuki & Senou, 2009 (Imai's pygmygoby)
- Trimma insularum R. Winterbottom & Hoese, 2015 (Cocos pygmygoby)
- Trimma irinae R. Winterbottom, 2014 (Irina's pygmygoby)
- Trimma kardium R. Winterbottom, Erdmann & Cahyani, 2015 (Heart pygmygoby)
- Trimma kitrinum R. Winterbottom & Hoese, 2015 (Citron pygmygoby)
- Trimma kudoi T. Suzuki & Senou, 2008 (Kudo’s pygmygoby)
- Trimma lantana R. Winterbottom & C. A. Villa, 2003 (Lantana pygmygoby)
- Trimma longispinum R. Winterbottom, 2023 (Long-spined pygmygoby)
- Trimma luteum Viviani, J. T. Williams & Planes, 2016 (Yellow-barred pygmygoby)
- Trimma macrophthalmus (Tomiyama, 1936) (Large-eye pygmygoby)
- Trimma maiandros Hoese, R. Winterbottom & Reader, 2011 (Zigzag pygmygoby)
- Trimma marinae R. Winterbottom, 2005 (Princess pygmygoby)
- Trimma matsunoi T. Suzuki, Sakaue & Senou, 2012 (Matsuno's pygmygoby)
- Trimma meityae R. Winterbottom & Erdmann, 2018 (Meity’s pygmygoby)
- Trimma mendelssohni (Goren, 1978) (Mendelssohn's pygmygoby)
- Trimma meranyx R. Winterbottom, Erdmann & Cahyani, 2014 (Day-night pygmygoby)
- Trimma meristum R. Winterbottom & Hoese, 2015 (Split-ray pygmygoby)
- Trimma milta R. Winterbottom, 2002 (Red-earth pygmygoby)
- Trimma multiclitellum G. R. Allen, 2015 (Multi-saddle pygmygoby)
- Trimma nasa R. Winterbottom, 2005 (Nasal-bar pygmygoby)
- Trimma nauagium G. R. Allen, 2015 (Shipwreck pygmygoby)
- Trimma naudei J. L. B. Smith, 1957 (Naude's pygmygoby)
- Trimma necopinum (Whitley, 1959) (Australian pygmygoby)
- Trimma nomurai T. Suzuki & Senou, 2007 (Lilac pygmygoby)
- Trimma okinawae (Aoyagi, 1949) (Orange-red pygmygoby)
- Trimma omanense R. Winterbottom, 2000 (Crescent-wing pygmygoby)
- Trimma pajama R. Winterbottom, Erdmann & Cahyani, 2014 (Pajama pygmygoby)
- Trimma panemorfum R. Winterbottom & Pyle, 2004 (Sublime pygmygoby)
- Trimma papayum R. Winterbottom, 2011 (Pawpaw pygmygoby)
- Trimma pentherum R. Winterbottom & Hoese, 2015 (Mourning pygmygoby)
- Trimma preclarum R. Winterbottom, 2006 (Exquisite pygmygoby)
- Trimma quadrimaculatum Hoese, Bogorodsky & A. O. Mal, 2015 (Four-spotted pygmygoby)
- Trimma randalli R. Winterbottom & Zur, 2007 (Randall's pygmygoby)
- Trimma readerae R. Winterbottom & Hoese, 2015 (Reader's pygmygoby)
- Trimma rubromaculatum G. R. Allen & Munday, 1995 (Red-spotted dwarfgoby)
- Trimma sanguinellus R. Winterbottom & Southcott, 2007 (Sanguinello pygmygoby)
- Trimma sheppardi R. Winterbottom, 1984 (Sheppard's pygmygoby)
- Trimma sostra R. Winterbottom, 2004 (Sostra's pygmygoby)
- Trimma squamicana R. Winterbottom, 2004 (Red-blotch pygmygoby)
- Trimma stobbsi R. Winterbottom, 2001 (Stobb's pygmygoby)
- Trimma striatum (Herre, 1945) (Red-lined pygmygoby)
- Trimma tauroculum R. Winterbottom & Zur, 2007 (Bulls-eye pygmygoby)
- Trimma taylori Lobel, 1979 (Yellow pygmygoby)
- Trimma tevegae Cohen & W. P. Davis, 1969 (Blue-stripe pygmygoby)
- Trimma trioculatum R. Winterbottom, Erdmann & Cahyani, 2015 (Three-eyed pygmygoby)
- Trimma ukkriti R. Winterbottom, 2021 (Ukkrit’s pygmygoby)
- Trimma unisquame (Gosline, 1959) (Black-margin pygmygoby)
- Trimma volcana R. Winterbottom, 2003 (Volcano pygmygoby)
- Trimma wangunui R. Winterbottom & Erdmann, 2019 (Wangunu's pygmygoby)
- Trimma winchi R. Winterbottom, 1984 (Winch's pygmygoby)
- Trimma winterbottomi J. E. Randall & Downing, 1994 (Winterbottom's pygmygoby)
- Trimma woutsi R. Winterbottom, 2002 (Wouter's pygmygoby)
- Trimma xanthochrum R. Winterbottom, 2011 (Step-spot pygmygoby)
- Trimma xanthum R. Winterbottom & Hoese, 2015 (Yellow-red pygmygoby)
- Trimma yanagitai T. Suzuki & Senou, 2007 (Brown pygmygoby)
- Trimma yanoi T. Suzuki & Senou, 2008 (Pudgy pygmygoby)
- Trimma yoshinoi T. Suzuki, Ko. Yano & Senou, 2015 (Yoshino's pygmygoby)
- Trimma zurae R. Winterbottom, Erdmann & Cahyani, 2014 (Marg's pygmygoby)
